

234001–234100 

|-bgcolor=#E9E9E9
| 234001 ||  || — || January 11, 1997 || Kitt Peak || Spacewatch || — || align=right | 1.6 km || 
|-id=002 bgcolor=#E9E9E9
| 234002 ||  || — || February 3, 1997 || Kitt Peak || Spacewatch || — || align=right | 1.0 km || 
|-id=003 bgcolor=#E9E9E9
| 234003 ||  || — || February 3, 1997 || Kitt Peak || Spacewatch || ADE || align=right | 2.6 km || 
|-id=004 bgcolor=#fefefe
| 234004 ||  || — || March 2, 1997 || Kitt Peak || Spacewatch || — || align=right data-sort-value="0.99" | 990 m || 
|-id=005 bgcolor=#E9E9E9
| 234005 ||  || — || March 10, 1997 || Kitt Peak || Spacewatch || — || align=right | 1.6 km || 
|-id=006 bgcolor=#E9E9E9
| 234006 ||  || — || March 5, 1997 || Kitt Peak || Spacewatch || HOF || align=right | 4.1 km || 
|-id=007 bgcolor=#fefefe
| 234007 ||  || — || March 10, 1997 || Kitt Peak || Spacewatch || — || align=right data-sort-value="0.87" | 870 m || 
|-id=008 bgcolor=#E9E9E9
| 234008 ||  || — || March 11, 1997 || Kitt Peak || Spacewatch || — || align=right | 2.1 km || 
|-id=009 bgcolor=#E9E9E9
| 234009 ||  || — || March 5, 1997 || Socorro || LINEAR || — || align=right | 1.6 km || 
|-id=010 bgcolor=#E9E9E9
| 234010 ||  || — || March 31, 1997 || Socorro || LINEAR || — || align=right | 2.0 km || 
|-id=011 bgcolor=#E9E9E9
| 234011 ||  || — || April 30, 1997 || Socorro || LINEAR || — || align=right | 3.3 km || 
|-id=012 bgcolor=#fefefe
| 234012 ||  || — || June 1, 1997 || Kitt Peak || Spacewatch || FLO || align=right data-sort-value="0.86" | 860 m || 
|-id=013 bgcolor=#E9E9E9
| 234013 ||  || — || June 8, 1997 || La Silla || E. W. Elst || — || align=right | 3.1 km || 
|-id=014 bgcolor=#fefefe
| 234014 ||  || — || November 22, 1997 || Kitt Peak || Spacewatch || — || align=right | 1.1 km || 
|-id=015 bgcolor=#E9E9E9
| 234015 ||  || — || March 20, 1998 || Socorro || LINEAR || — || align=right | 3.6 km || 
|-id=016 bgcolor=#d6d6d6
| 234016 ||  || — || March 18, 1998 || Kitt Peak || Spacewatch || — || align=right | 5.2 km || 
|-id=017 bgcolor=#E9E9E9
| 234017 ||  || — || July 23, 1998 || Caussols || ODAS || — || align=right | 1.2 km || 
|-id=018 bgcolor=#E9E9E9
| 234018 ||  || — || August 17, 1998 || Socorro || LINEAR || — || align=right | 4.1 km || 
|-id=019 bgcolor=#fefefe
| 234019 ||  || — || August 30, 1998 || Kitt Peak || Spacewatch || — || align=right | 1.1 km || 
|-id=020 bgcolor=#E9E9E9
| 234020 ||  || — || September 13, 1998 || Kitt Peak || Spacewatch || AST || align=right | 2.9 km || 
|-id=021 bgcolor=#fefefe
| 234021 ||  || — || September 13, 1998 || Kitt Peak || Spacewatch || — || align=right data-sort-value="0.93" | 930 m || 
|-id=022 bgcolor=#E9E9E9
| 234022 ||  || — || September 14, 1998 || Socorro || LINEAR || — || align=right | 4.0 km || 
|-id=023 bgcolor=#E9E9E9
| 234023 ||  || — || September 14, 1998 || Socorro || LINEAR || — || align=right | 3.4 km || 
|-id=024 bgcolor=#fefefe
| 234024 ||  || — || September 18, 1998 || Socorro || LINEAR || H || align=right data-sort-value="0.94" | 940 m || 
|-id=025 bgcolor=#E9E9E9
| 234025 ||  || — || September 26, 1998 || Socorro || LINEAR || — || align=right | 3.0 km || 
|-id=026 bgcolor=#fefefe
| 234026 Unioneastrofili ||  ||  || September 23, 1998 || San Marcello || L. Tesi || — || align=right | 1.00 km || 
|-id=027 bgcolor=#fefefe
| 234027 ||  || — || September 25, 1998 || Kitt Peak || Spacewatch || — || align=right data-sort-value="0.82" | 820 m || 
|-id=028 bgcolor=#fefefe
| 234028 ||  || — || September 16, 1998 || Anderson Mesa || LONEOS || FLO || align=right data-sort-value="0.91" | 910 m || 
|-id=029 bgcolor=#E9E9E9
| 234029 ||  || — || September 26, 1998 || Socorro || LINEAR || EUN || align=right | 1.8 km || 
|-id=030 bgcolor=#E9E9E9
| 234030 ||  || — || September 26, 1998 || Socorro || LINEAR || — || align=right | 3.3 km || 
|-id=031 bgcolor=#E9E9E9
| 234031 ||  || — || September 26, 1998 || Socorro || LINEAR || ADE || align=right | 4.3 km || 
|-id=032 bgcolor=#fefefe
| 234032 ||  || — || September 26, 1998 || Socorro || LINEAR || — || align=right | 2.6 km || 
|-id=033 bgcolor=#E9E9E9
| 234033 ||  || — || October 14, 1998 || Kitt Peak || Spacewatch || HEN || align=right | 1.3 km || 
|-id=034 bgcolor=#d6d6d6
| 234034 ||  || — || October 16, 1998 || Kitt Peak || Spacewatch || KOR || align=right | 1.6 km || 
|-id=035 bgcolor=#d6d6d6
| 234035 ||  || — || November 15, 1998 || Kitt Peak || Spacewatch || — || align=right | 3.1 km || 
|-id=036 bgcolor=#d6d6d6
| 234036 ||  || — || November 15, 1998 || Kitt Peak || Spacewatch || KOR || align=right | 1.8 km || 
|-id=037 bgcolor=#FA8072
| 234037 ||  || — || November 9, 1998 || Caussols || ODAS || — || align=right data-sort-value="0.82" | 820 m || 
|-id=038 bgcolor=#d6d6d6
| 234038 ||  || — || November 21, 1998 || Kitt Peak || Spacewatch || KOR || align=right | 1.7 km || 
|-id=039 bgcolor=#E9E9E9
| 234039 ||  || — || November 16, 1998 || Haleakala || NEAT || — || align=right | 5.0 km || 
|-id=040 bgcolor=#fefefe
| 234040 ||  || — || December 7, 1998 || Caussols || ODAS || — || align=right | 1.1 km || 
|-id=041 bgcolor=#fefefe
| 234041 ||  || — || December 10, 1998 || Kitt Peak || Spacewatch || NYS || align=right | 1.8 km || 
|-id=042 bgcolor=#d6d6d6
| 234042 ||  || — || January 15, 1999 || Kitt Peak || Spacewatch || — || align=right | 2.5 km || 
|-id=043 bgcolor=#d6d6d6
| 234043 ||  || — || January 19, 1999 || Caussols || ODAS || — || align=right | 3.5 km || 
|-id=044 bgcolor=#d6d6d6
| 234044 ||  || — || January 16, 1999 || Kitt Peak || Spacewatch || EOS || align=right | 2.8 km || 
|-id=045 bgcolor=#d6d6d6
| 234045 ||  || — || February 10, 1999 || Socorro || LINEAR || EUP || align=right | 5.2 km || 
|-id=046 bgcolor=#d6d6d6
| 234046 ||  || — || February 10, 1999 || Socorro || LINEAR || — || align=right | 4.4 km || 
|-id=047 bgcolor=#d6d6d6
| 234047 ||  || — || February 10, 1999 || Socorro || LINEAR || — || align=right | 2.2 km || 
|-id=048 bgcolor=#d6d6d6
| 234048 ||  || — || February 8, 1999 || Kitt Peak || Spacewatch || TIR || align=right | 4.0 km || 
|-id=049 bgcolor=#fefefe
| 234049 ||  || — || February 9, 1999 || Kitt Peak || Spacewatch || V || align=right data-sort-value="0.97" | 970 m || 
|-id=050 bgcolor=#fefefe
| 234050 ||  || — || February 12, 1999 || Kitt Peak || Spacewatch || NYS || align=right data-sort-value="0.71" | 710 m || 
|-id=051 bgcolor=#fefefe
| 234051 ||  || — || March 14, 1999 || Kitt Peak || Spacewatch || — || align=right | 1.9 km || 
|-id=052 bgcolor=#d6d6d6
| 234052 ||  || — || March 10, 1999 || Kitt Peak || Spacewatch || — || align=right | 3.6 km || 
|-id=053 bgcolor=#fefefe
| 234053 ||  || — || March 16, 1999 || Kitt Peak || Spacewatch || — || align=right | 2.6 km || 
|-id=054 bgcolor=#d6d6d6
| 234054 ||  || — || March 18, 1999 || Kitt Peak || Spacewatch || — || align=right | 3.7 km || 
|-id=055 bgcolor=#d6d6d6
| 234055 ||  || — || March 23, 1999 || Kitt Peak || Spacewatch || — || align=right | 3.1 km || 
|-id=056 bgcolor=#d6d6d6
| 234056 ||  || — || March 19, 1999 || Kitt Peak || Spacewatch || — || align=right | 5.0 km || 
|-id=057 bgcolor=#fefefe
| 234057 ||  || — || March 20, 1999 || Apache Point || SDSS || — || align=right | 1.1 km || 
|-id=058 bgcolor=#d6d6d6
| 234058 ||  || — || March 21, 1999 || Apache Point || SDSS || — || align=right | 4.0 km || 
|-id=059 bgcolor=#d6d6d6
| 234059 ||  || — || April 15, 1999 || Kitt Peak || Spacewatch || — || align=right | 4.5 km || 
|-id=060 bgcolor=#d6d6d6
| 234060 ||  || — || April 7, 1999 || Kitt Peak || Spacewatch || THM || align=right | 2.6 km || 
|-id=061 bgcolor=#FFC2E0
| 234061 ||  || — || April 18, 1999 || Catalina || CSS || APO +1km || align=right | 2.9 km || 
|-id=062 bgcolor=#d6d6d6
| 234062 ||  || — || April 17, 1999 || Socorro || LINEAR || Tj (2.95) || align=right | 3.8 km || 
|-id=063 bgcolor=#d6d6d6
| 234063 ||  || — || April 18, 1999 || Kitt Peak || Spacewatch || — || align=right | 4.8 km || 
|-id=064 bgcolor=#d6d6d6
| 234064 ||  || — || May 12, 1999 || Socorro || LINEAR || TIR || align=right | 3.6 km || 
|-id=065 bgcolor=#fefefe
| 234065 ||  || — || May 13, 1999 || Socorro || LINEAR || — || align=right | 1.3 km || 
|-id=066 bgcolor=#d6d6d6
| 234066 ||  || — || June 12, 1999 || Socorro || LINEAR || EUP || align=right | 4.5 km || 
|-id=067 bgcolor=#fefefe
| 234067 ||  || — || June 12, 1999 || Kitt Peak || Spacewatch || NYS || align=right data-sort-value="0.94" | 940 m || 
|-id=068 bgcolor=#fefefe
| 234068 ||  || — || June 12, 1999 || Kitt Peak || Spacewatch || — || align=right | 1.4 km || 
|-id=069 bgcolor=#E9E9E9
| 234069 || 1999 OA || — || July 16, 1999 || Woomera || F. B. Zoltowski || MAR || align=right | 1.4 km || 
|-id=070 bgcolor=#E9E9E9
| 234070 ||  || — || August 9, 1999 || Reedy Creek || J. Broughton || ADE || align=right | 5.9 km || 
|-id=071 bgcolor=#E9E9E9
| 234071 ||  || — || September 9, 1999 || Socorro || LINEAR || — || align=right | 1.7 km || 
|-id=072 bgcolor=#E9E9E9
| 234072 ||  || — || September 10, 1999 || Socorro || LINEAR || — || align=right | 2.3 km || 
|-id=073 bgcolor=#E9E9E9
| 234073 ||  || — || September 7, 1999 || Socorro || LINEAR || — || align=right | 2.7 km || 
|-id=074 bgcolor=#E9E9E9
| 234074 ||  || — || September 6, 1999 || Catalina || CSS || — || align=right | 3.1 km || 
|-id=075 bgcolor=#E9E9E9
| 234075 ||  || — || September 10, 1999 || Kitt Peak || Spacewatch || MAR || align=right | 2.5 km || 
|-id=076 bgcolor=#E9E9E9
| 234076 ||  || — || September 24, 1999 || Socorro || LINEAR || PAL || align=right | 5.4 km || 
|-id=077 bgcolor=#E9E9E9
| 234077 ||  || — || September 30, 1999 || Socorro || LINEAR || CLO || align=right | 4.8 km || 
|-id=078 bgcolor=#E9E9E9
| 234078 ||  || — || October 12, 1999 || Prescott || P. G. Comba || — || align=right | 2.1 km || 
|-id=079 bgcolor=#E9E9E9
| 234079 ||  || — || October 4, 1999 || Kitt Peak || Spacewatch || — || align=right | 1.4 km || 
|-id=080 bgcolor=#E9E9E9
| 234080 ||  || — || October 6, 1999 || Kitt Peak || Spacewatch || — || align=right | 2.0 km || 
|-id=081 bgcolor=#E9E9E9
| 234081 ||  || — || October 9, 1999 || Kitt Peak || Spacewatch || MIS || align=right | 3.9 km || 
|-id=082 bgcolor=#E9E9E9
| 234082 ||  || — || October 9, 1999 || Kitt Peak || Spacewatch || — || align=right | 1.8 km || 
|-id=083 bgcolor=#E9E9E9
| 234083 ||  || — || October 2, 1999 || Socorro || LINEAR || — || align=right | 5.3 km || 
|-id=084 bgcolor=#E9E9E9
| 234084 ||  || — || October 2, 1999 || Socorro || LINEAR || — || align=right | 2.6 km || 
|-id=085 bgcolor=#E9E9E9
| 234085 ||  || — || October 3, 1999 || Socorro || LINEAR || — || align=right | 3.4 km || 
|-id=086 bgcolor=#E9E9E9
| 234086 ||  || — || October 4, 1999 || Socorro || LINEAR || — || align=right | 1.3 km || 
|-id=087 bgcolor=#E9E9E9
| 234087 ||  || — || October 6, 1999 || Socorro || LINEAR || MAR || align=right | 1.9 km || 
|-id=088 bgcolor=#E9E9E9
| 234088 ||  || — || October 6, 1999 || Socorro || LINEAR || — || align=right | 1.8 km || 
|-id=089 bgcolor=#E9E9E9
| 234089 ||  || — || October 8, 1999 || Socorro || LINEAR || MAR || align=right | 1.6 km || 
|-id=090 bgcolor=#E9E9E9
| 234090 ||  || — || October 9, 1999 || Socorro || LINEAR || — || align=right | 2.0 km || 
|-id=091 bgcolor=#E9E9E9
| 234091 ||  || — || October 10, 1999 || Socorro || LINEAR || — || align=right | 1.5 km || 
|-id=092 bgcolor=#E9E9E9
| 234092 ||  || — || October 10, 1999 || Socorro || LINEAR || — || align=right | 2.0 km || 
|-id=093 bgcolor=#d6d6d6
| 234093 ||  || — || October 10, 1999 || Socorro || LINEAR || SHU3:2 || align=right | 8.0 km || 
|-id=094 bgcolor=#E9E9E9
| 234094 ||  || — || October 11, 1999 || Socorro || LINEAR || — || align=right | 1.4 km || 
|-id=095 bgcolor=#E9E9E9
| 234095 ||  || — || October 12, 1999 || Socorro || LINEAR || EUN || align=right | 2.1 km || 
|-id=096 bgcolor=#E9E9E9
| 234096 ||  || — || October 1, 1999 || Kitt Peak || Spacewatch || — || align=right | 2.8 km || 
|-id=097 bgcolor=#E9E9E9
| 234097 ||  || — || October 3, 1999 || Catalina || CSS || — || align=right | 2.9 km || 
|-id=098 bgcolor=#E9E9E9
| 234098 ||  || — || October 6, 1999 || Socorro || LINEAR || — || align=right | 3.4 km || 
|-id=099 bgcolor=#E9E9E9
| 234099 ||  || — || October 12, 1999 || Socorro || LINEAR || — || align=right | 3.6 km || 
|-id=100 bgcolor=#E9E9E9
| 234100 ||  || — || October 2, 1999 || Kitt Peak || Spacewatch || — || align=right | 4.6 km || 
|}

234101–234200 

|-bgcolor=#E9E9E9
| 234101 ||  || — || October 16, 1999 || Kitt Peak || Spacewatch || — || align=right | 1.3 km || 
|-id=102 bgcolor=#E9E9E9
| 234102 ||  || — || October 28, 1999 || Catalina || CSS || — || align=right | 3.0 km || 
|-id=103 bgcolor=#E9E9E9
| 234103 ||  || — || October 31, 1999 || Catalina || CSS || CLO || align=right | 3.1 km || 
|-id=104 bgcolor=#E9E9E9
| 234104 ||  || — || October 29, 1999 || Kitt Peak || Spacewatch || — || align=right | 1.7 km || 
|-id=105 bgcolor=#E9E9E9
| 234105 ||  || — || November 2, 1999 || Kitt Peak || Spacewatch || — || align=right | 3.6 km || 
|-id=106 bgcolor=#E9E9E9
| 234106 ||  || — || November 11, 1999 || Kitt Peak || Spacewatch || PAD || align=right | 4.2 km || 
|-id=107 bgcolor=#E9E9E9
| 234107 ||  || — || November 4, 1999 || Kitt Peak || Spacewatch || — || align=right | 1.9 km || 
|-id=108 bgcolor=#E9E9E9
| 234108 ||  || — || November 1, 1999 || Kitt Peak || Spacewatch || — || align=right | 1.3 km || 
|-id=109 bgcolor=#E9E9E9
| 234109 ||  || — || November 4, 1999 || Kitt Peak || Spacewatch || — || align=right | 2.2 km || 
|-id=110 bgcolor=#E9E9E9
| 234110 ||  || — || November 9, 1999 || Kitt Peak || Spacewatch || — || align=right | 2.4 km || 
|-id=111 bgcolor=#E9E9E9
| 234111 ||  || — || November 9, 1999 || Kitt Peak || Spacewatch || — || align=right | 1.8 km || 
|-id=112 bgcolor=#E9E9E9
| 234112 ||  || — || November 14, 1999 || Socorro || LINEAR || — || align=right | 1.9 km || 
|-id=113 bgcolor=#E9E9E9
| 234113 ||  || — || November 14, 1999 || Socorro || LINEAR || — || align=right | 1.8 km || 
|-id=114 bgcolor=#E9E9E9
| 234114 ||  || — || November 15, 1999 || Socorro || LINEAR || — || align=right | 3.5 km || 
|-id=115 bgcolor=#E9E9E9
| 234115 ||  || — || November 3, 1999 || Kitt Peak || Spacewatch || KON || align=right | 3.4 km || 
|-id=116 bgcolor=#E9E9E9
| 234116 ||  || — || November 5, 1999 || Socorro || LINEAR || — || align=right | 2.4 km || 
|-id=117 bgcolor=#E9E9E9
| 234117 ||  || — || November 26, 1999 || Ondřejov || L. Kotková || — || align=right | 3.7 km || 
|-id=118 bgcolor=#E9E9E9
| 234118 ||  || — || December 3, 1999 || Kitt Peak || Spacewatch || HEN || align=right | 1.4 km || 
|-id=119 bgcolor=#E9E9E9
| 234119 ||  || — || December 4, 1999 || Catalina || CSS || — || align=right | 4.9 km || 
|-id=120 bgcolor=#E9E9E9
| 234120 ||  || — || December 6, 1999 || Socorro || LINEAR || JUN || align=right | 1.7 km || 
|-id=121 bgcolor=#E9E9E9
| 234121 ||  || — || December 7, 1999 || Socorro || LINEAR || — || align=right | 6.1 km || 
|-id=122 bgcolor=#E9E9E9
| 234122 ||  || — || December 7, 1999 || Socorro || LINEAR || INO || align=right | 2.7 km || 
|-id=123 bgcolor=#d6d6d6
| 234123 ||  || — || December 12, 1999 || Socorro || LINEAR || — || align=right | 4.4 km || 
|-id=124 bgcolor=#E9E9E9
| 234124 ||  || — || December 2, 1999 || Kitt Peak || Spacewatch || — || align=right | 1.7 km || 
|-id=125 bgcolor=#d6d6d6
| 234125 ||  || — || December 15, 1999 || Kitt Peak || Spacewatch || KOR || align=right | 1.6 km || 
|-id=126 bgcolor=#E9E9E9
| 234126 ||  || — || December 31, 1999 || Kitt Peak || Spacewatch || — || align=right | 2.3 km || 
|-id=127 bgcolor=#E9E9E9
| 234127 ||  || — || December 16, 1999 || Kitt Peak || Spacewatch || HEN || align=right | 1.1 km || 
|-id=128 bgcolor=#E9E9E9
| 234128 ||  || — || December 17, 1999 || Kitt Peak || Spacewatch || — || align=right | 2.8 km || 
|-id=129 bgcolor=#E9E9E9
| 234129 ||  || — || January 5, 2000 || Socorro || LINEAR || — || align=right | 4.5 km || 
|-id=130 bgcolor=#fefefe
| 234130 ||  || — || January 28, 2000 || Kitt Peak || Spacewatch || — || align=right | 2.2 km || 
|-id=131 bgcolor=#E9E9E9
| 234131 ||  || — || January 30, 2000 || Kitt Peak || Spacewatch || PAD || align=right | 2.1 km || 
|-id=132 bgcolor=#E9E9E9
| 234132 ||  || — || January 26, 2000 || Kitt Peak || Spacewatch || — || align=right | 3.4 km || 
|-id=133 bgcolor=#fefefe
| 234133 ||  || — || February 3, 2000 || Kitt Peak || Spacewatch || FLO || align=right data-sort-value="0.66" | 660 m || 
|-id=134 bgcolor=#d6d6d6
| 234134 ||  || — || February 4, 2000 || Kitt Peak || Spacewatch || KOR || align=right | 1.4 km || 
|-id=135 bgcolor=#d6d6d6
| 234135 ||  || — || February 27, 2000 || Kitt Peak || Spacewatch || HYG || align=right | 4.2 km || 
|-id=136 bgcolor=#fefefe
| 234136 ||  || — || February 29, 2000 || Socorro || LINEAR || — || align=right data-sort-value="0.99" | 990 m || 
|-id=137 bgcolor=#d6d6d6
| 234137 ||  || — || February 29, 2000 || Socorro || LINEAR || CHA || align=right | 2.6 km || 
|-id=138 bgcolor=#fefefe
| 234138 ||  || — || February 29, 2000 || Socorro || LINEAR || — || align=right | 1.2 km || 
|-id=139 bgcolor=#fefefe
| 234139 ||  || — || February 29, 2000 || Socorro || LINEAR || — || align=right | 2.3 km || 
|-id=140 bgcolor=#d6d6d6
| 234140 ||  || — || February 29, 2000 || Socorro || LINEAR || — || align=right | 2.9 km || 
|-id=141 bgcolor=#fefefe
| 234141 ||  || — || March 3, 2000 || Socorro || LINEAR || FLO || align=right data-sort-value="0.85" | 850 m || 
|-id=142 bgcolor=#fefefe
| 234142 ||  || — || March 5, 2000 || Socorro || LINEAR || PHO || align=right | 1.3 km || 
|-id=143 bgcolor=#fefefe
| 234143 ||  || — || March 9, 2000 || Socorro || LINEAR || FLO || align=right | 1.7 km || 
|-id=144 bgcolor=#E9E9E9
| 234144 ||  || — || March 11, 2000 || Tebbutt || F. B. Zoltowski || — || align=right | 3.3 km || 
|-id=145 bgcolor=#FFC2E0
| 234145 ||  || — || March 9, 2000 || Socorro || LINEAR || ATEPHA || align=right data-sort-value="0.34" | 340 m || 
|-id=146 bgcolor=#d6d6d6
| 234146 ||  || — || March 12, 2000 || Kitt Peak || Spacewatch || — || align=right | 3.3 km || 
|-id=147 bgcolor=#d6d6d6
| 234147 ||  || — || March 25, 2000 || Kitt Peak || Spacewatch || — || align=right | 3.1 km || 
|-id=148 bgcolor=#FA8072
| 234148 ||  || — || March 26, 2000 || Socorro || LINEAR || PHO || align=right | 1.5 km || 
|-id=149 bgcolor=#d6d6d6
| 234149 ||  || — || March 27, 2000 || Kitt Peak || Spacewatch || — || align=right | 3.2 km || 
|-id=150 bgcolor=#fefefe
| 234150 ||  || — || March 30, 2000 || Kitt Peak || Spacewatch || — || align=right data-sort-value="0.87" | 870 m || 
|-id=151 bgcolor=#d6d6d6
| 234151 ||  || — || March 29, 2000 || Socorro || LINEAR || — || align=right | 4.5 km || 
|-id=152 bgcolor=#fefefe
| 234152 ||  || — || April 5, 2000 || Socorro || LINEAR || — || align=right | 2.4 km || 
|-id=153 bgcolor=#d6d6d6
| 234153 ||  || — || April 5, 2000 || Socorro || LINEAR || — || align=right | 4.0 km || 
|-id=154 bgcolor=#d6d6d6
| 234154 ||  || — || April 5, 2000 || Socorro || LINEAR || EOS || align=right | 2.5 km || 
|-id=155 bgcolor=#fefefe
| 234155 ||  || — || April 5, 2000 || Socorro || LINEAR || — || align=right data-sort-value="0.79" | 790 m || 
|-id=156 bgcolor=#d6d6d6
| 234156 ||  || — || April 5, 2000 || Socorro || LINEAR || — || align=right | 4.2 km || 
|-id=157 bgcolor=#fefefe
| 234157 ||  || — || April 4, 2000 || Anderson Mesa || LONEOS || FLO || align=right data-sort-value="0.95" | 950 m || 
|-id=158 bgcolor=#fefefe
| 234158 ||  || — || April 27, 2000 || Kitt Peak || Spacewatch || — || align=right | 1.5 km || 
|-id=159 bgcolor=#fefefe
| 234159 ||  || — || April 29, 2000 || Socorro || LINEAR || V || align=right data-sort-value="0.92" | 920 m || 
|-id=160 bgcolor=#fefefe
| 234160 ||  || — || April 26, 2000 || Kitt Peak || Spacewatch || FLO || align=right | 2.1 km || 
|-id=161 bgcolor=#fefefe
| 234161 ||  || — || April 29, 2000 || Socorro || LINEAR || — || align=right data-sort-value="0.94" | 940 m || 
|-id=162 bgcolor=#d6d6d6
| 234162 ||  || — || April 27, 2000 || Anderson Mesa || LONEOS || — || align=right | 4.0 km || 
|-id=163 bgcolor=#d6d6d6
| 234163 ||  || — || May 2, 2000 || Socorro || LINEAR || EUP || align=right | 6.2 km || 
|-id=164 bgcolor=#fefefe
| 234164 ||  || — || May 26, 2000 || Socorro || LINEAR || PHO || align=right | 2.7 km || 
|-id=165 bgcolor=#d6d6d6
| 234165 ||  || — || May 29, 2000 || Anderson Mesa || LONEOS || ALA || align=right | 5.5 km || 
|-id=166 bgcolor=#d6d6d6
| 234166 ||  || — || May 31, 2000 || Socorro || LINEAR || — || align=right | 7.4 km || 
|-id=167 bgcolor=#FA8072
| 234167 ||  || — || May 29, 2000 || Socorro || LINEAR || — || align=right data-sort-value="0.97" | 970 m || 
|-id=168 bgcolor=#E9E9E9
| 234168 ||  || — || June 1, 2000 || Kitt Peak || Spacewatch || — || align=right | 4.0 km || 
|-id=169 bgcolor=#fefefe
| 234169 ||  || — || June 2, 2000 || Reedy Creek || J. Broughton || FLO || align=right | 1.0 km || 
|-id=170 bgcolor=#fefefe
| 234170 ||  || — || June 6, 2000 || Kitt Peak || Spacewatch || V || align=right data-sort-value="0.84" | 840 m || 
|-id=171 bgcolor=#fefefe
| 234171 ||  || — || June 10, 2000 || Prescott || P. G. Comba || FLO || align=right | 1.0 km || 
|-id=172 bgcolor=#d6d6d6
| 234172 ||  || — || July 5, 2000 || Anderson Mesa || LONEOS || THB || align=right | 4.8 km || 
|-id=173 bgcolor=#fefefe
| 234173 ||  || — || July 5, 2000 || Anderson Mesa || LONEOS || NYS || align=right data-sort-value="0.95" | 950 m || 
|-id=174 bgcolor=#fefefe
| 234174 ||  || — || July 28, 2000 || Prescott || P. G. Comba || MAS || align=right | 1.1 km || 
|-id=175 bgcolor=#d6d6d6
| 234175 ||  || — || July 24, 2000 || Socorro || LINEAR || — || align=right | 4.7 km || 
|-id=176 bgcolor=#fefefe
| 234176 ||  || — || July 29, 2000 || Anderson Mesa || LONEOS || — || align=right data-sort-value="0.89" | 890 m || 
|-id=177 bgcolor=#E9E9E9
| 234177 ||  || — || August 24, 2000 || Socorro || LINEAR || MIT || align=right | 3.8 km || 
|-id=178 bgcolor=#E9E9E9
| 234178 ||  || — || August 24, 2000 || Socorro || LINEAR || — || align=right | 1.4 km || 
|-id=179 bgcolor=#fefefe
| 234179 ||  || — || August 25, 2000 || Socorro || LINEAR || — || align=right | 2.4 km || 
|-id=180 bgcolor=#fefefe
| 234180 ||  || — || August 24, 2000 || Socorro || LINEAR || MAS || align=right | 1.1 km || 
|-id=181 bgcolor=#fefefe
| 234181 ||  || — || August 24, 2000 || Socorro || LINEAR || NYS || align=right | 1.0 km || 
|-id=182 bgcolor=#fefefe
| 234182 ||  || — || August 24, 2000 || Socorro || LINEAR || ERI || align=right | 2.2 km || 
|-id=183 bgcolor=#fefefe
| 234183 ||  || — || August 24, 2000 || Socorro || LINEAR || — || align=right | 1.3 km || 
|-id=184 bgcolor=#fefefe
| 234184 ||  || — || August 25, 2000 || Socorro || LINEAR || — || align=right | 2.7 km || 
|-id=185 bgcolor=#fefefe
| 234185 ||  || — || August 28, 2000 || Socorro || LINEAR || H || align=right data-sort-value="0.91" | 910 m || 
|-id=186 bgcolor=#fefefe
| 234186 ||  || — || August 24, 2000 || Socorro || LINEAR || — || align=right | 2.8 km || 
|-id=187 bgcolor=#fefefe
| 234187 ||  || — || August 24, 2000 || Socorro || LINEAR || NYS || align=right | 1.0 km || 
|-id=188 bgcolor=#E9E9E9
| 234188 ||  || — || August 25, 2000 || Socorro || LINEAR || — || align=right | 3.5 km || 
|-id=189 bgcolor=#fefefe
| 234189 ||  || — || August 26, 2000 || Socorro || LINEAR || — || align=right | 1.0 km || 
|-id=190 bgcolor=#fefefe
| 234190 ||  || — || August 28, 2000 || Socorro || LINEAR || NYS || align=right | 1.2 km || 
|-id=191 bgcolor=#fefefe
| 234191 ||  || — || August 31, 2000 || Socorro || LINEAR || — || align=right | 1.8 km || 
|-id=192 bgcolor=#fefefe
| 234192 ||  || — || August 29, 2000 || Socorro || LINEAR || — || align=right | 1.2 km || 
|-id=193 bgcolor=#E9E9E9
| 234193 ||  || — || August 31, 2000 || Socorro || LINEAR || ADE || align=right | 3.8 km || 
|-id=194 bgcolor=#fefefe
| 234194 ||  || — || August 31, 2000 || Socorro || LINEAR || — || align=right | 1.6 km || 
|-id=195 bgcolor=#fefefe
| 234195 ||  || — || August 29, 2000 || Socorro || LINEAR || — || align=right | 1.5 km || 
|-id=196 bgcolor=#E9E9E9
| 234196 ||  || — || August 31, 2000 || Socorro || LINEAR || KON || align=right | 3.9 km || 
|-id=197 bgcolor=#FA8072
| 234197 ||  || — || August 31, 2000 || Socorro || LINEAR || — || align=right | 2.6 km || 
|-id=198 bgcolor=#fefefe
| 234198 ||  || — || August 26, 2000 || Socorro || LINEAR || — || align=right | 1.1 km || 
|-id=199 bgcolor=#fefefe
| 234199 ||  || — || August 29, 2000 || Socorro || LINEAR || — || align=right | 1.1 km || 
|-id=200 bgcolor=#fefefe
| 234200 ||  || — || August 31, 2000 || Socorro || LINEAR || — || align=right | 1.2 km || 
|}

234201–234300 

|-bgcolor=#fefefe
| 234201 ||  || — || August 31, 2000 || Socorro || LINEAR || — || align=right | 1.4 km || 
|-id=202 bgcolor=#fefefe
| 234202 ||  || — || August 20, 2000 || Anderson Mesa || LONEOS || MAS || align=right | 1.0 km || 
|-id=203 bgcolor=#E9E9E9
| 234203 ||  || — || August 31, 2000 || Socorro || LINEAR || — || align=right | 3.8 km || 
|-id=204 bgcolor=#fefefe
| 234204 ||  || — || September 1, 2000 || Socorro || LINEAR || ERI || align=right | 3.1 km || 
|-id=205 bgcolor=#fefefe
| 234205 ||  || — || September 7, 2000 || Kitt Peak || Spacewatch || — || align=right | 1.5 km || 
|-id=206 bgcolor=#fefefe
| 234206 ||  || — || September 2, 2000 || Socorro || LINEAR || — || align=right | 1.4 km || 
|-id=207 bgcolor=#d6d6d6
| 234207 ||  || — || September 3, 2000 || Socorro || LINEAR || — || align=right | 4.7 km || 
|-id=208 bgcolor=#fefefe
| 234208 ||  || — || September 23, 2000 || Socorro || LINEAR || H || align=right | 1.2 km || 
|-id=209 bgcolor=#E9E9E9
| 234209 ||  || — || September 23, 2000 || Socorro || LINEAR || MIT || align=right | 3.1 km || 
|-id=210 bgcolor=#fefefe
| 234210 ||  || — || September 24, 2000 || Socorro || LINEAR || V || align=right | 1.2 km || 
|-id=211 bgcolor=#fefefe
| 234211 ||  || — || September 27, 2000 || Socorro || LINEAR || H || align=right data-sort-value="0.95" | 950 m || 
|-id=212 bgcolor=#fefefe
| 234212 ||  || — || September 24, 2000 || Socorro || LINEAR || MAS || align=right | 1.1 km || 
|-id=213 bgcolor=#E9E9E9
| 234213 ||  || — || September 24, 2000 || Socorro || LINEAR || — || align=right | 1.3 km || 
|-id=214 bgcolor=#E9E9E9
| 234214 ||  || — || September 24, 2000 || Socorro || LINEAR || — || align=right data-sort-value="0.99" | 990 m || 
|-id=215 bgcolor=#fefefe
| 234215 ||  || — || September 24, 2000 || Socorro || LINEAR || MAS || align=right data-sort-value="0.93" | 930 m || 
|-id=216 bgcolor=#d6d6d6
| 234216 ||  || — || September 24, 2000 || Socorro || LINEAR || ALA || align=right | 5.0 km || 
|-id=217 bgcolor=#E9E9E9
| 234217 ||  || — || September 24, 2000 || Socorro || LINEAR || — || align=right | 1.7 km || 
|-id=218 bgcolor=#fefefe
| 234218 ||  || — || September 24, 2000 || Socorro || LINEAR || — || align=right | 1.3 km || 
|-id=219 bgcolor=#fefefe
| 234219 ||  || — || September 24, 2000 || Socorro || LINEAR || — || align=right | 3.1 km || 
|-id=220 bgcolor=#fefefe
| 234220 ||  || — || September 24, 2000 || Socorro || LINEAR || NYS || align=right | 1.3 km || 
|-id=221 bgcolor=#fefefe
| 234221 ||  || — || September 23, 2000 || Socorro || LINEAR || — || align=right | 1.4 km || 
|-id=222 bgcolor=#E9E9E9
| 234222 ||  || — || September 23, 2000 || Socorro || LINEAR || — || align=right | 1.7 km || 
|-id=223 bgcolor=#d6d6d6
| 234223 ||  || — || September 23, 2000 || Socorro || LINEAR || EUP || align=right | 5.9 km || 
|-id=224 bgcolor=#fefefe
| 234224 ||  || — || September 24, 2000 || Socorro || LINEAR || V || align=right | 1.2 km || 
|-id=225 bgcolor=#FA8072
| 234225 ||  || — || September 23, 2000 || Socorro || LINEAR || — || align=right | 1.6 km || 
|-id=226 bgcolor=#d6d6d6
| 234226 ||  || — || September 28, 2000 || Socorro || LINEAR || EUP || align=right | 7.3 km || 
|-id=227 bgcolor=#E9E9E9
| 234227 ||  || — || September 26, 2000 || Socorro || LINEAR || — || align=right data-sort-value="0.95" | 950 m || 
|-id=228 bgcolor=#fefefe
| 234228 ||  || — || September 28, 2000 || Socorro || LINEAR || — || align=right | 1.1 km || 
|-id=229 bgcolor=#E9E9E9
| 234229 ||  || — || September 30, 2000 || Socorro || LINEAR || — || align=right | 1.5 km || 
|-id=230 bgcolor=#E9E9E9
| 234230 ||  || — || September 21, 2000 || Socorro || LINEAR || — || align=right | 1.5 km || 
|-id=231 bgcolor=#fefefe
| 234231 ||  || — || September 24, 2000 || Socorro || LINEAR || ERI || align=right | 2.5 km || 
|-id=232 bgcolor=#d6d6d6
| 234232 ||  || — || September 24, 2000 || Socorro || LINEAR || HYG || align=right | 5.3 km || 
|-id=233 bgcolor=#E9E9E9
| 234233 ||  || — || September 24, 2000 || Socorro || LINEAR || — || align=right | 3.0 km || 
|-id=234 bgcolor=#fefefe
| 234234 ||  || — || September 24, 2000 || Socorro || LINEAR || — || align=right | 1.8 km || 
|-id=235 bgcolor=#fefefe
| 234235 ||  || — || September 27, 2000 || Socorro || LINEAR || — || align=right | 2.0 km || 
|-id=236 bgcolor=#E9E9E9
| 234236 ||  || — || September 28, 2000 || Socorro || LINEAR || — || align=right | 1.2 km || 
|-id=237 bgcolor=#fefefe
| 234237 ||  || — || September 28, 2000 || Socorro || LINEAR || — || align=right | 1.8 km || 
|-id=238 bgcolor=#E9E9E9
| 234238 ||  || — || September 23, 2000 || Socorro || LINEAR || ADE || align=right | 3.3 km || 
|-id=239 bgcolor=#fefefe
| 234239 ||  || — || September 30, 2000 || Socorro || LINEAR || — || align=right | 1.5 km || 
|-id=240 bgcolor=#fefefe
| 234240 ||  || — || September 30, 2000 || Socorro || LINEAR || LCI || align=right | 1.8 km || 
|-id=241 bgcolor=#fefefe
| 234241 ||  || — || September 29, 2000 || Haleakala || NEAT || — || align=right | 2.0 km || 
|-id=242 bgcolor=#FA8072
| 234242 ||  || — || September 24, 2000 || Socorro || LINEAR || — || align=right | 1.6 km || 
|-id=243 bgcolor=#fefefe
| 234243 ||  || — || September 30, 2000 || Anderson Mesa || LONEOS || — || align=right | 2.4 km || 
|-id=244 bgcolor=#fefefe
| 234244 ||  || — || September 23, 2000 || Anderson Mesa || LONEOS || — || align=right | 1.0 km || 
|-id=245 bgcolor=#fefefe
| 234245 ||  || — || October 1, 2000 || Socorro || LINEAR || MAS || align=right | 1.0 km || 
|-id=246 bgcolor=#fefefe
| 234246 ||  || — || October 1, 2000 || Socorro || LINEAR || ERI || align=right | 2.4 km || 
|-id=247 bgcolor=#E9E9E9
| 234247 ||  || — || October 3, 2000 || Socorro || LINEAR || EUN || align=right | 2.2 km || 
|-id=248 bgcolor=#fefefe
| 234248 ||  || — || October 1, 2000 || Socorro || LINEAR || — || align=right | 1.1 km || 
|-id=249 bgcolor=#E9E9E9
| 234249 ||  || — || October 1, 2000 || Socorro || LINEAR || — || align=right | 1.4 km || 
|-id=250 bgcolor=#fefefe
| 234250 ||  || — || October 1, 2000 || Anderson Mesa || LONEOS || PHO || align=right | 2.0 km || 
|-id=251 bgcolor=#E9E9E9
| 234251 ||  || — || October 2, 2000 || Anderson Mesa || LONEOS || — || align=right | 1.9 km || 
|-id=252 bgcolor=#E9E9E9
| 234252 ||  || — || October 24, 2000 || Socorro || LINEAR || — || align=right | 1.5 km || 
|-id=253 bgcolor=#E9E9E9
| 234253 ||  || — || October 24, 2000 || Socorro || LINEAR || — || align=right | 2.1 km || 
|-id=254 bgcolor=#fefefe
| 234254 ||  || — || October 20, 2000 || Nacogdoches || SFA Obs. || NYS || align=right | 1.1 km || 
|-id=255 bgcolor=#E9E9E9
| 234255 ||  || — || October 24, 2000 || Socorro || LINEAR || KON || align=right | 3.8 km || 
|-id=256 bgcolor=#E9E9E9
| 234256 ||  || — || October 24, 2000 || Socorro || LINEAR || — || align=right | 1.8 km || 
|-id=257 bgcolor=#E9E9E9
| 234257 ||  || — || October 25, 2000 || Socorro || LINEAR || — || align=right | 1.7 km || 
|-id=258 bgcolor=#E9E9E9
| 234258 ||  || — || October 25, 2000 || Socorro || LINEAR || — || align=right | 1.8 km || 
|-id=259 bgcolor=#fefefe
| 234259 ||  || — || October 31, 2000 || Socorro || LINEAR || V || align=right | 1.3 km || 
|-id=260 bgcolor=#E9E9E9
| 234260 ||  || — || November 1, 2000 || Socorro || LINEAR || — || align=right | 1.3 km || 
|-id=261 bgcolor=#d6d6d6
| 234261 ||  || — || November 1, 2000 || Socorro || LINEAR || EUP || align=right | 6.0 km || 
|-id=262 bgcolor=#E9E9E9
| 234262 ||  || — || November 1, 2000 || Socorro || LINEAR || — || align=right | 1.3 km || 
|-id=263 bgcolor=#fefefe
| 234263 ||  || — || November 1, 2000 || Socorro || LINEAR || V || align=right | 1.1 km || 
|-id=264 bgcolor=#E9E9E9
| 234264 ||  || — || November 1, 2000 || Socorro || LINEAR || — || align=right | 1.2 km || 
|-id=265 bgcolor=#d6d6d6
| 234265 ||  || — || November 3, 2000 || Socorro || LINEAR || EUP || align=right | 8.0 km || 
|-id=266 bgcolor=#E9E9E9
| 234266 ||  || — || November 3, 2000 || Socorro || LINEAR || — || align=right | 2.2 km || 
|-id=267 bgcolor=#E9E9E9
| 234267 ||  || — || November 3, 2000 || Socorro || LINEAR || — || align=right | 1.6 km || 
|-id=268 bgcolor=#E9E9E9
| 234268 ||  || — || November 16, 2000 || Socorro || LINEAR || BAR || align=right | 1.5 km || 
|-id=269 bgcolor=#E9E9E9
| 234269 ||  || — || November 19, 2000 || Socorro || LINEAR || — || align=right | 3.8 km || 
|-id=270 bgcolor=#E9E9E9
| 234270 ||  || — || November 20, 2000 || Socorro || LINEAR || KON || align=right | 3.0 km || 
|-id=271 bgcolor=#E9E9E9
| 234271 ||  || — || November 21, 2000 || Socorro || LINEAR || EUN || align=right | 1.9 km || 
|-id=272 bgcolor=#E9E9E9
| 234272 ||  || — || November 20, 2000 || Socorro || LINEAR || — || align=right | 1.2 km || 
|-id=273 bgcolor=#E9E9E9
| 234273 ||  || — || November 20, 2000 || Socorro || LINEAR || — || align=right | 1.9 km || 
|-id=274 bgcolor=#fefefe
| 234274 ||  || — || November 19, 2000 || Socorro || LINEAR || — || align=right | 1.7 km || 
|-id=275 bgcolor=#E9E9E9
| 234275 ||  || — || November 21, 2000 || Socorro || LINEAR || — || align=right | 2.6 km || 
|-id=276 bgcolor=#E9E9E9
| 234276 ||  || — || November 26, 2000 || Socorro || LINEAR || ADE || align=right | 3.1 km || 
|-id=277 bgcolor=#E9E9E9
| 234277 ||  || — || November 20, 2000 || Socorro || LINEAR || JUN || align=right | 3.2 km || 
|-id=278 bgcolor=#E9E9E9
| 234278 ||  || — || November 20, 2000 || Socorro || LINEAR || — || align=right | 3.2 km || 
|-id=279 bgcolor=#fefefe
| 234279 ||  || — || November 29, 2000 || Socorro || LINEAR || — || align=right | 1.9 km || 
|-id=280 bgcolor=#E9E9E9
| 234280 ||  || — || November 30, 2000 || Socorro || LINEAR || — || align=right | 2.4 km || 
|-id=281 bgcolor=#E9E9E9
| 234281 ||  || — || November 20, 2000 || Anderson Mesa || LONEOS || — || align=right | 1.3 km || 
|-id=282 bgcolor=#E9E9E9
| 234282 ||  || — || November 20, 2000 || Anderson Mesa || LONEOS || — || align=right | 1.5 km || 
|-id=283 bgcolor=#E9E9E9
| 234283 ||  || — || November 25, 2000 || Socorro || LINEAR || — || align=right | 2.1 km || 
|-id=284 bgcolor=#E9E9E9
| 234284 ||  || — || November 27, 2000 || Haleakala || NEAT || — || align=right | 1.3 km || 
|-id=285 bgcolor=#E9E9E9
| 234285 ||  || — || December 1, 2000 || Socorro || LINEAR || — || align=right | 2.5 km || 
|-id=286 bgcolor=#E9E9E9
| 234286 ||  || — || December 1, 2000 || Socorro || LINEAR || — || align=right | 2.4 km || 
|-id=287 bgcolor=#E9E9E9
| 234287 ||  || — || December 1, 2000 || Socorro || LINEAR || — || align=right | 2.7 km || 
|-id=288 bgcolor=#E9E9E9
| 234288 ||  || — || December 4, 2000 || Socorro || LINEAR || ADE || align=right | 3.1 km || 
|-id=289 bgcolor=#E9E9E9
| 234289 ||  || — || December 5, 2000 || Socorro || LINEAR || — || align=right | 4.5 km || 
|-id=290 bgcolor=#E9E9E9
| 234290 ||  || — || December 6, 2000 || Socorro || LINEAR || — || align=right | 4.2 km || 
|-id=291 bgcolor=#E9E9E9
| 234291 ||  || — || December 20, 2000 || Socorro || LINEAR || — || align=right | 2.3 km || 
|-id=292 bgcolor=#E9E9E9
| 234292 Wolfganghansch ||  ||  || December 16, 2000 || Uccle || T. Pauwels || — || align=right | 1.6 km || 
|-id=293 bgcolor=#E9E9E9
| 234293 ||  || — || December 21, 2000 || Kitt Peak || Spacewatch || — || align=right | 2.3 km || 
|-id=294 bgcolor=#E9E9E9
| 234294 Pappsándor ||  ||  || December 31, 2000 || Piszkéstető || K. Sárneczky, L. Kiss || MRX || align=right | 1.4 km || 
|-id=295 bgcolor=#E9E9E9
| 234295 ||  || — || December 30, 2000 || Socorro || LINEAR || — || align=right | 6.3 km || 
|-id=296 bgcolor=#E9E9E9
| 234296 ||  || — || December 30, 2000 || Socorro || LINEAR || — || align=right | 3.5 km || 
|-id=297 bgcolor=#E9E9E9
| 234297 ||  || — || December 29, 2000 || Kitt Peak || Spacewatch || — || align=right | 1.7 km || 
|-id=298 bgcolor=#E9E9E9
| 234298 ||  || — || December 30, 2000 || Socorro || LINEAR || — || align=right | 1.8 km || 
|-id=299 bgcolor=#E9E9E9
| 234299 ||  || — || December 30, 2000 || Socorro || LINEAR || — || align=right | 1.8 km || 
|-id=300 bgcolor=#E9E9E9
| 234300 ||  || — || December 29, 2000 || Anderson Mesa || LONEOS || — || align=right | 2.0 km || 
|}

234301–234400 

|-bgcolor=#E9E9E9
| 234301 ||  || — || December 30, 2000 || Socorro || LINEAR || — || align=right | 2.0 km || 
|-id=302 bgcolor=#FA8072
| 234302 ||  || — || January 1, 2001 || Haleakala || NEAT || — || align=right | 3.1 km || 
|-id=303 bgcolor=#E9E9E9
| 234303 ||  || — || January 1, 2001 || Kitt Peak || Spacewatch || — || align=right | 1.9 km || 
|-id=304 bgcolor=#E9E9E9
| 234304 ||  || — || January 2, 2001 || Socorro || LINEAR || — || align=right | 2.2 km || 
|-id=305 bgcolor=#E9E9E9
| 234305 ||  || — || January 3, 2001 || Socorro || LINEAR || — || align=right | 1.9 km || 
|-id=306 bgcolor=#E9E9E9
| 234306 ||  || — || January 5, 2001 || Socorro || LINEAR || — || align=right | 2.1 km || 
|-id=307 bgcolor=#E9E9E9
| 234307 ||  || — || January 5, 2001 || Socorro || LINEAR || — || align=right | 2.0 km || 
|-id=308 bgcolor=#E9E9E9
| 234308 ||  || — || January 2, 2001 || Kitt Peak || Spacewatch || — || align=right | 3.2 km || 
|-id=309 bgcolor=#E9E9E9
| 234309 ||  || — || January 3, 2001 || Anderson Mesa || LONEOS || MIT || align=right | 3.9 km || 
|-id=310 bgcolor=#E9E9E9
| 234310 ||  || — || January 15, 2001 || Socorro || LINEAR || — || align=right | 1.8 km || 
|-id=311 bgcolor=#E9E9E9
| 234311 ||  || — || January 3, 2001 || Socorro || LINEAR || ADE || align=right | 4.2 km || 
|-id=312 bgcolor=#FA8072
| 234312 ||  || — || January 16, 2001 || Haleakala || NEAT || — || align=right data-sort-value="0.93" | 930 m || 
|-id=313 bgcolor=#E9E9E9
| 234313 ||  || — || January 19, 2001 || Socorro || LINEAR || — || align=right | 1.7 km || 
|-id=314 bgcolor=#E9E9E9
| 234314 ||  || — || January 20, 2001 || Socorro || LINEAR || — || align=right | 2.4 km || 
|-id=315 bgcolor=#E9E9E9
| 234315 ||  || — || January 21, 2001 || Socorro || LINEAR || — || align=right | 1.8 km || 
|-id=316 bgcolor=#E9E9E9
| 234316 ||  || — || January 16, 2001 || Haleakala || NEAT || — || align=right | 3.1 km || 
|-id=317 bgcolor=#E9E9E9
| 234317 ||  || — || January 26, 2001 || Socorro || LINEAR || — || align=right | 2.0 km || 
|-id=318 bgcolor=#E9E9E9
| 234318 ||  || — || February 1, 2001 || Socorro || LINEAR || — || align=right | 1.9 km || 
|-id=319 bgcolor=#E9E9E9
| 234319 ||  || — || February 1, 2001 || Socorro || LINEAR || — || align=right | 2.9 km || 
|-id=320 bgcolor=#E9E9E9
| 234320 ||  || — || February 2, 2001 || Socorro || LINEAR || EUN || align=right | 2.2 km || 
|-id=321 bgcolor=#E9E9E9
| 234321 ||  || — || February 1, 2001 || Anderson Mesa || LONEOS || — || align=right | 2.5 km || 
|-id=322 bgcolor=#E9E9E9
| 234322 ||  || — || February 12, 2001 || Socorro || LINEAR || — || align=right | 5.6 km || 
|-id=323 bgcolor=#E9E9E9
| 234323 ||  || — || February 16, 2001 || Socorro || LINEAR || INO || align=right | 1.9 km || 
|-id=324 bgcolor=#E9E9E9
| 234324 ||  || — || February 19, 2001 || Socorro || LINEAR || KON || align=right | 4.1 km || 
|-id=325 bgcolor=#E9E9E9
| 234325 ||  || — || February 16, 2001 || Kitt Peak || Spacewatch || — || align=right | 2.2 km || 
|-id=326 bgcolor=#E9E9E9
| 234326 ||  || — || February 19, 2001 || Socorro || LINEAR || EUN || align=right | 2.1 km || 
|-id=327 bgcolor=#E9E9E9
| 234327 ||  || — || February 16, 2001 || Kitt Peak || Spacewatch || — || align=right | 3.8 km || 
|-id=328 bgcolor=#E9E9E9
| 234328 ||  || — || February 19, 2001 || Socorro || LINEAR || — || align=right | 1.9 km || 
|-id=329 bgcolor=#E9E9E9
| 234329 ||  || — || February 17, 2001 || Socorro || LINEAR || — || align=right | 2.8 km || 
|-id=330 bgcolor=#FA8072
| 234330 ||  || — || March 1, 2001 || Socorro || LINEAR || — || align=right | 4.3 km || 
|-id=331 bgcolor=#E9E9E9
| 234331 ||  || — || March 2, 2001 || Anderson Mesa || LONEOS || — || align=right | 2.6 km || 
|-id=332 bgcolor=#E9E9E9
| 234332 ||  || — || March 15, 2001 || Socorro || LINEAR || — || align=right | 3.3 km || 
|-id=333 bgcolor=#E9E9E9
| 234333 ||  || — || March 15, 2001 || Oizumi || T. Kobayashi || — || align=right | 2.0 km || 
|-id=334 bgcolor=#E9E9E9
| 234334 ||  || — || March 15, 2001 || Anderson Mesa || LONEOS || — || align=right | 2.0 km || 
|-id=335 bgcolor=#E9E9E9
| 234335 ||  || — || March 16, 2001 || Socorro || LINEAR || — || align=right | 4.5 km || 
|-id=336 bgcolor=#E9E9E9
| 234336 ||  || — || March 18, 2001 || Junk Bond || D. Healy || — || align=right | 3.3 km || 
|-id=337 bgcolor=#E9E9E9
| 234337 ||  || — || March 18, 2001 || Socorro || LINEAR || — || align=right | 3.4 km || 
|-id=338 bgcolor=#E9E9E9
| 234338 ||  || — || March 18, 2001 || Socorro || LINEAR || — || align=right | 2.6 km || 
|-id=339 bgcolor=#E9E9E9
| 234339 ||  || — || March 18, 2001 || Socorro || LINEAR || — || align=right | 4.4 km || 
|-id=340 bgcolor=#E9E9E9
| 234340 ||  || — || March 18, 2001 || Socorro || LINEAR || — || align=right | 2.9 km || 
|-id=341 bgcolor=#FFC2E0
| 234341 ||  || — || March 21, 2001 || Anderson Mesa || LONEOS || ATE || align=right data-sort-value="0.34" | 340 m || 
|-id=342 bgcolor=#E9E9E9
| 234342 ||  || — || March 19, 2001 || Socorro || LINEAR || PAL || align=right | 3.5 km || 
|-id=343 bgcolor=#E9E9E9
| 234343 ||  || — || March 26, 2001 || Kitt Peak || Spacewatch || HOF || align=right | 3.2 km || 
|-id=344 bgcolor=#E9E9E9
| 234344 ||  || — || March 26, 2001 || Kitt Peak || Spacewatch || PAD || align=right | 2.6 km || 
|-id=345 bgcolor=#E9E9E9
| 234345 ||  || — || March 27, 2001 || Kitt Peak || Spacewatch || — || align=right | 2.6 km || 
|-id=346 bgcolor=#E9E9E9
| 234346 ||  || — || March 24, 2001 || Socorro || LINEAR || — || align=right | 1.9 km || 
|-id=347 bgcolor=#E9E9E9
| 234347 ||  || — || March 26, 2001 || Socorro || LINEAR || — || align=right | 3.6 km || 
|-id=348 bgcolor=#d6d6d6
| 234348 ||  || — || March 28, 2001 || Kitt Peak || Spacewatch || — || align=right | 7.0 km || 
|-id=349 bgcolor=#E9E9E9
| 234349 ||  || — || March 19, 2001 || Cima Ekar || ADAS || — || align=right | 4.0 km || 
|-id=350 bgcolor=#E9E9E9
| 234350 ||  || — || April 15, 2001 || Socorro || LINEAR || GEF || align=right | 1.9 km || 
|-id=351 bgcolor=#fefefe
| 234351 ||  || — || April 27, 2001 || Socorro || LINEAR || — || align=right | 1.7 km || 
|-id=352 bgcolor=#E9E9E9
| 234352 ||  || — || April 16, 2001 || Socorro || LINEAR || — || align=right | 3.5 km || 
|-id=353 bgcolor=#E9E9E9
| 234353 ||  || — || April 16, 2001 || Anderson Mesa || LONEOS || — || align=right | 2.2 km || 
|-id=354 bgcolor=#E9E9E9
| 234354 ||  || — || April 18, 2001 || Socorro || LINEAR || — || align=right | 3.5 km || 
|-id=355 bgcolor=#E9E9E9
| 234355 ||  || — || April 25, 2001 || Anderson Mesa || LONEOS || — || align=right | 2.2 km || 
|-id=356 bgcolor=#d6d6d6
| 234356 ||  || — || April 28, 2001 || Kitt Peak || Spacewatch || — || align=right | 2.4 km || 
|-id=357 bgcolor=#d6d6d6
| 234357 ||  || — || May 13, 2001 || Ondřejov || L. Kotková || — || align=right | 5.2 km || 
|-id=358 bgcolor=#E9E9E9
| 234358 ||  || — || May 11, 2001 || Haleakala || NEAT || — || align=right | 1.8 km || 
|-id=359 bgcolor=#E9E9E9
| 234359 ||  || — || May 21, 2001 || Anderson Mesa || LONEOS || — || align=right | 5.2 km || 
|-id=360 bgcolor=#FA8072
| 234360 ||  || — || June 19, 2001 || Palomar || NEAT || — || align=right | 1.2 km || 
|-id=361 bgcolor=#d6d6d6
| 234361 ||  || — || July 12, 2001 || Palomar || NEAT || — || align=right | 5.6 km || 
|-id=362 bgcolor=#fefefe
| 234362 ||  || — || July 12, 2001 || Palomar || NEAT || NYS || align=right | 1.1 km || 
|-id=363 bgcolor=#d6d6d6
| 234363 ||  || — || July 14, 2001 || Palomar || NEAT || — || align=right | 4.9 km || 
|-id=364 bgcolor=#d6d6d6
| 234364 ||  || — || July 18, 2001 || Palomar || NEAT || EOS || align=right | 2.8 km || 
|-id=365 bgcolor=#d6d6d6
| 234365 ||  || — || July 18, 2001 || Palomar || NEAT || — || align=right | 4.7 km || 
|-id=366 bgcolor=#d6d6d6
| 234366 ||  || — || July 21, 2001 || Haleakala || NEAT || — || align=right | 5.2 km || 
|-id=367 bgcolor=#d6d6d6
| 234367 ||  || — || July 16, 2001 || Haleakala || NEAT || — || align=right | 2.1 km || 
|-id=368 bgcolor=#fefefe
| 234368 ||  || — || July 25, 2001 || Haleakala || NEAT || — || align=right | 3.4 km || 
|-id=369 bgcolor=#fefefe
| 234369 ||  || — || July 21, 2001 || Kitt Peak || Spacewatch || — || align=right | 1.1 km || 
|-id=370 bgcolor=#d6d6d6
| 234370 ||  || — || July 29, 2001 || Palomar || NEAT || — || align=right | 5.9 km || 
|-id=371 bgcolor=#fefefe
| 234371 ||  || — || July 22, 2001 || Socorro || LINEAR || — || align=right | 1.2 km || 
|-id=372 bgcolor=#d6d6d6
| 234372 ||  || — || July 17, 2001 || Anderson Mesa || LONEOS || — || align=right | 4.3 km || 
|-id=373 bgcolor=#fefefe
| 234373 ||  || — || August 11, 2001 || Haleakala || NEAT || — || align=right | 1.1 km || 
|-id=374 bgcolor=#fefefe
| 234374 ||  || — || August 11, 2001 || Palomar || NEAT || — || align=right | 1.7 km || 
|-id=375 bgcolor=#fefefe
| 234375 ||  || — || August 14, 2001 || Haleakala || NEAT || — || align=right | 2.8 km || 
|-id=376 bgcolor=#d6d6d6
| 234376 ||  || — || August 16, 2001 || Socorro || LINEAR || LIX || align=right | 4.6 km || 
|-id=377 bgcolor=#fefefe
| 234377 ||  || — || August 16, 2001 || Socorro || LINEAR || — || align=right | 1.3 km || 
|-id=378 bgcolor=#d6d6d6
| 234378 ||  || — || August 16, 2001 || Socorro || LINEAR || — || align=right | 5.6 km || 
|-id=379 bgcolor=#d6d6d6
| 234379 ||  || — || August 16, 2001 || Socorro || LINEAR || THM || align=right | 3.3 km || 
|-id=380 bgcolor=#fefefe
| 234380 ||  || — || August 16, 2001 || Socorro || LINEAR || — || align=right | 1.1 km || 
|-id=381 bgcolor=#fefefe
| 234381 ||  || — || August 18, 2001 || Socorro || LINEAR || ERI || align=right | 2.1 km || 
|-id=382 bgcolor=#FA8072
| 234382 ||  || — || August 18, 2001 || Socorro || LINEAR || — || align=right | 1.2 km || 
|-id=383 bgcolor=#fefefe
| 234383 ||  || — || August 16, 2001 || Kitt Peak || Spacewatch || — || align=right | 1.8 km || 
|-id=384 bgcolor=#d6d6d6
| 234384 ||  || — || August 17, 2001 || Socorro || LINEAR || EUP || align=right | 6.6 km || 
|-id=385 bgcolor=#fefefe
| 234385 ||  || — || August 23, 2001 || Anderson Mesa || LONEOS || — || align=right | 1.1 km || 
|-id=386 bgcolor=#d6d6d6
| 234386 ||  || — || August 25, 2001 || Ondřejov || P. Kušnirák, P. Pravec || — || align=right | 4.5 km || 
|-id=387 bgcolor=#d6d6d6
| 234387 ||  || — || August 22, 2001 || Socorro || LINEAR || — || align=right | 6.8 km || 
|-id=388 bgcolor=#fefefe
| 234388 ||  || — || August 23, 2001 || Anderson Mesa || LONEOS || — || align=right | 1.0 km || 
|-id=389 bgcolor=#fefefe
| 234389 ||  || — || August 31, 2001 || Desert Eagle || W. K. Y. Yeung || FLO || align=right | 1.2 km || 
|-id=390 bgcolor=#d6d6d6
| 234390 ||  || — || August 23, 2001 || Kitt Peak || Spacewatch || — || align=right | 4.8 km || 
|-id=391 bgcolor=#fefefe
| 234391 ||  || — || August 23, 2001 || Anderson Mesa || LONEOS || — || align=right | 1.3 km || 
|-id=392 bgcolor=#d6d6d6
| 234392 ||  || — || August 24, 2001 || Socorro || LINEAR || — || align=right | 3.8 km || 
|-id=393 bgcolor=#fefefe
| 234393 ||  || — || August 24, 2001 || Socorro || LINEAR || FLO || align=right | 1.00 km || 
|-id=394 bgcolor=#d6d6d6
| 234394 ||  || — || August 25, 2001 || Socorro || LINEAR || — || align=right | 4.1 km || 
|-id=395 bgcolor=#fefefe
| 234395 ||  || — || August 25, 2001 || Socorro || LINEAR || — || align=right | 1.1 km || 
|-id=396 bgcolor=#fefefe
| 234396 ||  || — || August 25, 2001 || Socorro || LINEAR || — || align=right | 1.4 km || 
|-id=397 bgcolor=#d6d6d6
| 234397 ||  || — || August 26, 2001 || Desert Eagle || W. K. Y. Yeung || EUP || align=right | 6.8 km || 
|-id=398 bgcolor=#fefefe
| 234398 ||  || — || August 18, 2001 || Anderson Mesa || LONEOS || CIM || align=right | 3.4 km || 
|-id=399 bgcolor=#fefefe
| 234399 ||  || — || August 17, 2001 || Socorro || LINEAR || — || align=right | 2.3 km || 
|-id=400 bgcolor=#d6d6d6
| 234400 ||  || — || August 16, 2001 || Palomar || NEAT || — || align=right | 6.2 km || 
|}

234401–234500 

|-bgcolor=#fefefe
| 234401 ||  || — || August 25, 2001 || Anderson Mesa || LONEOS || — || align=right | 3.0 km || 
|-id=402 bgcolor=#d6d6d6
| 234402 ||  || — || August 22, 2001 || Kitt Peak || Spacewatch || EOS || align=right | 2.3 km || 
|-id=403 bgcolor=#fefefe
| 234403 ||  || — || September 11, 2001 || Anderson Mesa || LONEOS || — || align=right | 1.1 km || 
|-id=404 bgcolor=#d6d6d6
| 234404 ||  || — || September 10, 2001 || Socorro || LINEAR || — || align=right | 3.3 km || 
|-id=405 bgcolor=#FA8072
| 234405 ||  || — || September 11, 2001 || Desert Eagle || W. K. Y. Yeung || PHO || align=right | 1.7 km || 
|-id=406 bgcolor=#fefefe
| 234406 ||  || — || September 11, 2001 || Desert Eagle || W. K. Y. Yeung || — || align=right | 1.3 km || 
|-id=407 bgcolor=#fefefe
| 234407 ||  || — || September 7, 2001 || Socorro || LINEAR || — || align=right | 1.2 km || 
|-id=408 bgcolor=#d6d6d6
| 234408 ||  || — || September 7, 2001 || Socorro || LINEAR || — || align=right | 4.3 km || 
|-id=409 bgcolor=#fefefe
| 234409 ||  || — || September 7, 2001 || Socorro || LINEAR || — || align=right | 1.0 km || 
|-id=410 bgcolor=#d6d6d6
| 234410 ||  || — || September 7, 2001 || Socorro || LINEAR || — || align=right | 4.7 km || 
|-id=411 bgcolor=#fefefe
| 234411 ||  || — || September 7, 2001 || Socorro || LINEAR || V || align=right data-sort-value="0.80" | 800 m || 
|-id=412 bgcolor=#fefefe
| 234412 ||  || — || September 11, 2001 || Socorro || LINEAR || PHO || align=right | 1.6 km || 
|-id=413 bgcolor=#fefefe
| 234413 ||  || — || September 12, 2001 || Socorro || LINEAR || FLO || align=right data-sort-value="0.96" | 960 m || 
|-id=414 bgcolor=#fefefe
| 234414 ||  || — || September 12, 2001 || Socorro || LINEAR || FLO || align=right data-sort-value="0.78" | 780 m || 
|-id=415 bgcolor=#d6d6d6
| 234415 ||  || — || September 12, 2001 || Socorro || LINEAR || — || align=right | 6.9 km || 
|-id=416 bgcolor=#d6d6d6
| 234416 ||  || — || September 12, 2001 || Socorro || LINEAR || — || align=right | 4.3 km || 
|-id=417 bgcolor=#fefefe
| 234417 ||  || — || September 10, 2001 || Socorro || LINEAR || — || align=right | 1.5 km || 
|-id=418 bgcolor=#fefefe
| 234418 ||  || — || September 11, 2001 || Anderson Mesa || LONEOS || FLO || align=right data-sort-value="0.86" | 860 m || 
|-id=419 bgcolor=#fefefe
| 234419 ||  || — || September 11, 2001 || Anderson Mesa || LONEOS || — || align=right data-sort-value="0.87" | 870 m || 
|-id=420 bgcolor=#FA8072
| 234420 ||  || — || September 11, 2001 || Anderson Mesa || LONEOS || H || align=right | 1.1 km || 
|-id=421 bgcolor=#fefefe
| 234421 ||  || — || September 11, 2001 || Anderson Mesa || LONEOS || FLO || align=right data-sort-value="0.94" | 940 m || 
|-id=422 bgcolor=#fefefe
| 234422 ||  || — || September 12, 2001 || Socorro || LINEAR || — || align=right | 2.5 km || 
|-id=423 bgcolor=#d6d6d6
| 234423 ||  || — || September 12, 2001 || Socorro || LINEAR || — || align=right | 3.6 km || 
|-id=424 bgcolor=#d6d6d6
| 234424 ||  || — || September 12, 2001 || Socorro || LINEAR || — || align=right | 4.1 km || 
|-id=425 bgcolor=#d6d6d6
| 234425 ||  || — || September 12, 2001 || Socorro || LINEAR || — || align=right | 5.2 km || 
|-id=426 bgcolor=#d6d6d6
| 234426 ||  || — || September 12, 2001 || Socorro || LINEAR || HYG || align=right | 3.7 km || 
|-id=427 bgcolor=#fefefe
| 234427 ||  || — || September 12, 2001 || Socorro || LINEAR || — || align=right | 1.4 km || 
|-id=428 bgcolor=#d6d6d6
| 234428 ||  || — || September 9, 2001 || Palomar || NEAT || URS || align=right | 6.8 km || 
|-id=429 bgcolor=#d6d6d6
| 234429 ||  || — || September 9, 2001 || Anderson Mesa || LONEOS || — || align=right | 5.1 km || 
|-id=430 bgcolor=#fefefe
| 234430 ||  || — || September 18, 2001 || Kitt Peak || Spacewatch || — || align=right | 1.0 km || 
|-id=431 bgcolor=#d6d6d6
| 234431 ||  || — || September 18, 2001 || Desert Eagle || W. K. Y. Yeung || — || align=right | 4.4 km || 
|-id=432 bgcolor=#d6d6d6
| 234432 ||  || — || September 16, 2001 || Socorro || LINEAR || URS || align=right | 6.0 km || 
|-id=433 bgcolor=#fefefe
| 234433 ||  || — || September 16, 2001 || Socorro || LINEAR || — || align=right | 1.1 km || 
|-id=434 bgcolor=#d6d6d6
| 234434 ||  || — || September 16, 2001 || Socorro || LINEAR || — || align=right | 3.7 km || 
|-id=435 bgcolor=#fefefe
| 234435 ||  || — || September 16, 2001 || Socorro || LINEAR || ERI || align=right | 1.7 km || 
|-id=436 bgcolor=#fefefe
| 234436 ||  || — || September 16, 2001 || Socorro || LINEAR || V || align=right data-sort-value="0.88" | 880 m || 
|-id=437 bgcolor=#d6d6d6
| 234437 ||  || — || September 16, 2001 || Socorro || LINEAR || — || align=right | 3.8 km || 
|-id=438 bgcolor=#fefefe
| 234438 ||  || — || September 17, 2001 || Socorro || LINEAR || — || align=right | 1.4 km || 
|-id=439 bgcolor=#d6d6d6
| 234439 ||  || — || September 17, 2001 || Socorro || LINEAR || — || align=right | 4.8 km || 
|-id=440 bgcolor=#d6d6d6
| 234440 ||  || — || September 20, 2001 || Socorro || LINEAR || VER || align=right | 3.8 km || 
|-id=441 bgcolor=#d6d6d6
| 234441 ||  || — || September 20, 2001 || Socorro || LINEAR || 7:4 || align=right | 3.9 km || 
|-id=442 bgcolor=#fefefe
| 234442 ||  || — || September 20, 2001 || Socorro || LINEAR || — || align=right data-sort-value="0.84" | 840 m || 
|-id=443 bgcolor=#fefefe
| 234443 ||  || — || September 20, 2001 || Socorro || LINEAR || FLO || align=right data-sort-value="0.89" | 890 m || 
|-id=444 bgcolor=#d6d6d6
| 234444 ||  || — || September 20, 2001 || Socorro || LINEAR || — || align=right | 3.3 km || 
|-id=445 bgcolor=#d6d6d6
| 234445 ||  || — || September 16, 2001 || Socorro || LINEAR || — || align=right | 5.3 km || 
|-id=446 bgcolor=#fefefe
| 234446 ||  || — || September 16, 2001 || Socorro || LINEAR || — || align=right | 1.1 km || 
|-id=447 bgcolor=#fefefe
| 234447 ||  || — || September 16, 2001 || Socorro || LINEAR || NYS || align=right | 2.0 km || 
|-id=448 bgcolor=#fefefe
| 234448 ||  || — || September 16, 2001 || Socorro || LINEAR || — || align=right | 1.2 km || 
|-id=449 bgcolor=#fefefe
| 234449 ||  || — || September 17, 2001 || Socorro || LINEAR || — || align=right | 1.5 km || 
|-id=450 bgcolor=#fefefe
| 234450 ||  || — || September 17, 2001 || Socorro || LINEAR || — || align=right data-sort-value="0.93" | 930 m || 
|-id=451 bgcolor=#d6d6d6
| 234451 ||  || — || September 17, 2001 || Socorro || LINEAR || — || align=right | 5.3 km || 
|-id=452 bgcolor=#fefefe
| 234452 ||  || — || September 17, 2001 || Socorro || LINEAR || V || align=right data-sort-value="0.94" | 940 m || 
|-id=453 bgcolor=#d6d6d6
| 234453 ||  || — || September 17, 2001 || Socorro || LINEAR || LUT || align=right | 6.4 km || 
|-id=454 bgcolor=#fefefe
| 234454 ||  || — || September 17, 2001 || Socorro || LINEAR || — || align=right | 1.2 km || 
|-id=455 bgcolor=#d6d6d6
| 234455 ||  || — || September 17, 2001 || Socorro || LINEAR || — || align=right | 5.8 km || 
|-id=456 bgcolor=#fefefe
| 234456 ||  || — || September 19, 2001 || Socorro || LINEAR || — || align=right | 1.0 km || 
|-id=457 bgcolor=#d6d6d6
| 234457 ||  || — || September 19, 2001 || Socorro || LINEAR || — || align=right | 4.2 km || 
|-id=458 bgcolor=#FA8072
| 234458 ||  || — || September 19, 2001 || Socorro || LINEAR || — || align=right data-sort-value="0.90" | 900 m || 
|-id=459 bgcolor=#d6d6d6
| 234459 ||  || — || September 19, 2001 || Socorro || LINEAR || — || align=right | 5.6 km || 
|-id=460 bgcolor=#fefefe
| 234460 ||  || — || September 19, 2001 || Socorro || LINEAR || — || align=right | 1.0 km || 
|-id=461 bgcolor=#fefefe
| 234461 ||  || — || September 19, 2001 || Socorro || LINEAR || V || align=right data-sort-value="0.77" | 770 m || 
|-id=462 bgcolor=#d6d6d6
| 234462 ||  || — || September 19, 2001 || Socorro || LINEAR || HYG || align=right | 3.7 km || 
|-id=463 bgcolor=#fefefe
| 234463 ||  || — || September 19, 2001 || Socorro || LINEAR || — || align=right data-sort-value="0.98" | 980 m || 
|-id=464 bgcolor=#fefefe
| 234464 ||  || — || September 19, 2001 || Socorro || LINEAR || NYS || align=right data-sort-value="0.83" | 830 m || 
|-id=465 bgcolor=#fefefe
| 234465 ||  || — || September 19, 2001 || Socorro || LINEAR || NYS || align=right data-sort-value="0.89" | 890 m || 
|-id=466 bgcolor=#fefefe
| 234466 ||  || — || September 19, 2001 || Socorro || LINEAR || V || align=right data-sort-value="0.82" | 820 m || 
|-id=467 bgcolor=#fefefe
| 234467 ||  || — || September 19, 2001 || Socorro || LINEAR || V || align=right data-sort-value="0.85" | 850 m || 
|-id=468 bgcolor=#fefefe
| 234468 ||  || — || September 19, 2001 || Socorro || LINEAR || FLO || align=right data-sort-value="0.60" | 600 m || 
|-id=469 bgcolor=#d6d6d6
| 234469 ||  || — || September 19, 2001 || Socorro || LINEAR || HYG || align=right | 4.2 km || 
|-id=470 bgcolor=#d6d6d6
| 234470 ||  || — || September 19, 2001 || Socorro || LINEAR || — || align=right | 4.8 km || 
|-id=471 bgcolor=#d6d6d6
| 234471 ||  || — || September 20, 2001 || Socorro || LINEAR || — || align=right | 3.5 km || 
|-id=472 bgcolor=#fefefe
| 234472 ||  || — || September 25, 2001 || Desert Eagle || W. K. Y. Yeung || — || align=right | 1.4 km || 
|-id=473 bgcolor=#d6d6d6
| 234473 ||  || — || September 19, 2001 || Kitt Peak || Spacewatch || — || align=right | 5.9 km || 
|-id=474 bgcolor=#d6d6d6
| 234474 ||  || — || September 22, 2001 || Kitt Peak || Spacewatch || — || align=right | 4.3 km || 
|-id=475 bgcolor=#d6d6d6
| 234475 ||  || — || September 20, 2001 || Socorro || LINEAR || — || align=right | 5.0 km || 
|-id=476 bgcolor=#d6d6d6
| 234476 ||  || — || September 20, 2001 || Socorro || LINEAR || — || align=right | 5.1 km || 
|-id=477 bgcolor=#d6d6d6
| 234477 ||  || — || September 19, 2001 || Socorro || LINEAR || — || align=right | 6.2 km || 
|-id=478 bgcolor=#fefefe
| 234478 ||  || — || September 25, 2001 || Socorro || LINEAR || — || align=right | 1.6 km || 
|-id=479 bgcolor=#fefefe
| 234479 ||  || — || September 19, 2001 || Socorro || LINEAR || — || align=right data-sort-value="0.98" | 980 m || 
|-id=480 bgcolor=#d6d6d6
| 234480 ||  || — || September 20, 2001 || Socorro || LINEAR || — || align=right | 4.3 km || 
|-id=481 bgcolor=#fefefe
| 234481 ||  || — || October 10, 2001 || Palomar || NEAT || ERI || align=right | 3.2 km || 
|-id=482 bgcolor=#fefefe
| 234482 ||  || — || October 13, 2001 || Socorro || LINEAR || — || align=right | 1.0 km || 
|-id=483 bgcolor=#d6d6d6
| 234483 ||  || — || October 10, 2001 || Palomar || NEAT || — || align=right | 8.9 km || 
|-id=484 bgcolor=#fefefe
| 234484 ||  || — || October 14, 2001 || Socorro || LINEAR || — || align=right data-sort-value="0.94" | 940 m || 
|-id=485 bgcolor=#fefefe
| 234485 ||  || — || October 14, 2001 || Socorro || LINEAR || — || align=right data-sort-value="0.95" | 950 m || 
|-id=486 bgcolor=#fefefe
| 234486 ||  || — || October 13, 2001 || Socorro || LINEAR || — || align=right | 1.1 km || 
|-id=487 bgcolor=#fefefe
| 234487 ||  || — || October 15, 2001 || Socorro || LINEAR || — || align=right | 1.2 km || 
|-id=488 bgcolor=#fefefe
| 234488 ||  || — || October 13, 2001 || Socorro || LINEAR || — || align=right data-sort-value="0.98" | 980 m || 
|-id=489 bgcolor=#d6d6d6
| 234489 ||  || — || October 13, 2001 || Socorro || LINEAR || LIX || align=right | 6.3 km || 
|-id=490 bgcolor=#d6d6d6
| 234490 ||  || — || October 13, 2001 || Socorro || LINEAR || — || align=right | 4.1 km || 
|-id=491 bgcolor=#fefefe
| 234491 ||  || — || October 13, 2001 || Socorro || LINEAR || — || align=right | 1.0 km || 
|-id=492 bgcolor=#fefefe
| 234492 ||  || — || October 13, 2001 || Socorro || LINEAR || — || align=right | 1.2 km || 
|-id=493 bgcolor=#fefefe
| 234493 ||  || — || October 13, 2001 || Socorro || LINEAR || — || align=right | 1.0 km || 
|-id=494 bgcolor=#fefefe
| 234494 ||  || — || October 14, 2001 || Socorro || LINEAR || V || align=right data-sort-value="0.83" | 830 m || 
|-id=495 bgcolor=#fefefe
| 234495 ||  || — || October 14, 2001 || Socorro || LINEAR || FLO || align=right data-sort-value="0.84" | 840 m || 
|-id=496 bgcolor=#fefefe
| 234496 ||  || — || October 14, 2001 || Socorro || LINEAR || — || align=right | 1.4 km || 
|-id=497 bgcolor=#d6d6d6
| 234497 ||  || — || October 14, 2001 || Socorro || LINEAR || — || align=right | 6.0 km || 
|-id=498 bgcolor=#d6d6d6
| 234498 ||  || — || October 14, 2001 || Socorro || LINEAR || — || align=right | 5.6 km || 
|-id=499 bgcolor=#fefefe
| 234499 ||  || — || October 14, 2001 || Socorro || LINEAR || — || align=right | 1.0 km || 
|-id=500 bgcolor=#fefefe
| 234500 ||  || — || October 14, 2001 || Socorro || LINEAR || NYS || align=right data-sort-value="0.75" | 750 m || 
|}

234501–234600 

|-bgcolor=#fefefe
| 234501 ||  || — || October 15, 2001 || Socorro || LINEAR || — || align=right | 1.5 km || 
|-id=502 bgcolor=#d6d6d6
| 234502 ||  || — || October 11, 2001 || Palomar || NEAT || — || align=right | 4.3 km || 
|-id=503 bgcolor=#fefefe
| 234503 ||  || — || October 10, 2001 || Palomar || NEAT || NYS || align=right data-sort-value="0.83" | 830 m || 
|-id=504 bgcolor=#fefefe
| 234504 ||  || — || October 10, 2001 || Palomar || NEAT || V || align=right | 1.2 km || 
|-id=505 bgcolor=#fefefe
| 234505 ||  || — || October 10, 2001 || Palomar || NEAT || — || align=right | 1.4 km || 
|-id=506 bgcolor=#fefefe
| 234506 ||  || — || October 10, 2001 || Palomar || NEAT || NYS || align=right data-sort-value="0.81" | 810 m || 
|-id=507 bgcolor=#fefefe
| 234507 ||  || — || October 15, 2001 || Palomar || NEAT || FLO || align=right | 1.0 km || 
|-id=508 bgcolor=#fefefe
| 234508 ||  || — || October 14, 2001 || Kitt Peak || Spacewatch || NYS || align=right data-sort-value="0.93" | 930 m || 
|-id=509 bgcolor=#d6d6d6
| 234509 ||  || — || October 15, 2001 || Socorro || LINEAR || — || align=right | 4.0 km || 
|-id=510 bgcolor=#fefefe
| 234510 ||  || — || October 14, 2001 || Socorro || LINEAR || FLO || align=right | 1.1 km || 
|-id=511 bgcolor=#fefefe
| 234511 ||  || — || October 14, 2001 || Socorro || LINEAR || — || align=right | 1.2 km || 
|-id=512 bgcolor=#d6d6d6
| 234512 ||  || — || October 13, 2001 || Palomar || NEAT || — || align=right | 6.6 km || 
|-id=513 bgcolor=#fefefe
| 234513 ||  || — || October 15, 2001 || Palomar || NEAT || — || align=right data-sort-value="0.97" | 970 m || 
|-id=514 bgcolor=#d6d6d6
| 234514 ||  || — || October 14, 2001 || Socorro || LINEAR || 7:4 || align=right | 7.7 km || 
|-id=515 bgcolor=#d6d6d6
| 234515 ||  || — || October 8, 2001 || Palomar || NEAT || EOS || align=right | 3.3 km || 
|-id=516 bgcolor=#fefefe
| 234516 ||  || — || October 24, 2001 || Desert Eagle || W. K. Y. Yeung || — || align=right | 1.4 km || 
|-id=517 bgcolor=#d6d6d6
| 234517 ||  || — || October 24, 2001 || Desert Eagle || W. K. Y. Yeung || LIX || align=right | 5.9 km || 
|-id=518 bgcolor=#d6d6d6
| 234518 ||  || — || October 18, 2001 || Socorro || LINEAR || — || align=right | 5.5 km || 
|-id=519 bgcolor=#fefefe
| 234519 ||  || — || October 16, 2001 || Socorro || LINEAR || — || align=right | 2.7 km || 
|-id=520 bgcolor=#fefefe
| 234520 ||  || — || October 17, 2001 || Socorro || LINEAR || — || align=right | 1.4 km || 
|-id=521 bgcolor=#d6d6d6
| 234521 ||  || — || October 17, 2001 || Socorro || LINEAR || — || align=right | 5.0 km || 
|-id=522 bgcolor=#fefefe
| 234522 ||  || — || October 17, 2001 || Socorro || LINEAR || NYS || align=right | 1.0 km || 
|-id=523 bgcolor=#fefefe
| 234523 ||  || — || October 23, 2001 || Socorro || LINEAR || PHO || align=right | 1.8 km || 
|-id=524 bgcolor=#fefefe
| 234524 ||  || — || October 16, 2001 || Kitt Peak || Spacewatch || MAS || align=right data-sort-value="0.97" | 970 m || 
|-id=525 bgcolor=#fefefe
| 234525 ||  || — || October 18, 2001 || Palomar || NEAT || — || align=right data-sort-value="0.95" | 950 m || 
|-id=526 bgcolor=#E9E9E9
| 234526 ||  || — || October 17, 2001 || Socorro || LINEAR || — || align=right | 2.1 km || 
|-id=527 bgcolor=#d6d6d6
| 234527 ||  || — || October 23, 2001 || Socorro || LINEAR || — || align=right | 5.8 km || 
|-id=528 bgcolor=#fefefe
| 234528 ||  || — || October 23, 2001 || Socorro || LINEAR || — || align=right | 3.2 km || 
|-id=529 bgcolor=#fefefe
| 234529 ||  || — || October 23, 2001 || Socorro || LINEAR || FLO || align=right | 1.0 km || 
|-id=530 bgcolor=#fefefe
| 234530 ||  || — || October 23, 2001 || Socorro || LINEAR || NYS || align=right | 1.0 km || 
|-id=531 bgcolor=#fefefe
| 234531 ||  || — || October 23, 2001 || Socorro || LINEAR || NYS || align=right | 2.5 km || 
|-id=532 bgcolor=#fefefe
| 234532 ||  || — || October 23, 2001 || Socorro || LINEAR || — || align=right | 2.8 km || 
|-id=533 bgcolor=#fefefe
| 234533 ||  || — || October 23, 2001 || Socorro || LINEAR || — || align=right | 1.3 km || 
|-id=534 bgcolor=#fefefe
| 234534 ||  || — || October 18, 2001 || Palomar || NEAT || — || align=right data-sort-value="0.96" | 960 m || 
|-id=535 bgcolor=#fefefe
| 234535 ||  || — || October 19, 2001 || Anderson Mesa || LONEOS || V || align=right data-sort-value="0.87" | 870 m || 
|-id=536 bgcolor=#d6d6d6
| 234536 ||  || — || October 20, 2001 || Socorro || LINEAR || — || align=right | 5.4 km || 
|-id=537 bgcolor=#fefefe
| 234537 ||  || — || October 20, 2001 || Socorro || LINEAR || FLO || align=right data-sort-value="0.75" | 750 m || 
|-id=538 bgcolor=#fefefe
| 234538 ||  || — || October 21, 2001 || Kitt Peak || Spacewatch || V || align=right data-sort-value="0.78" | 780 m || 
|-id=539 bgcolor=#fefefe
| 234539 ||  || — || October 24, 2001 || Palomar || NEAT || — || align=right | 1.1 km || 
|-id=540 bgcolor=#fefefe
| 234540 ||  || — || October 19, 2001 || Kitt Peak || Spacewatch || — || align=right data-sort-value="0.94" | 940 m || 
|-id=541 bgcolor=#fefefe
| 234541 ||  || — || October 16, 2001 || Palomar || NEAT || V || align=right data-sort-value="0.89" | 890 m || 
|-id=542 bgcolor=#d6d6d6
| 234542 ||  || — || October 17, 2001 || Palomar || NEAT || HYG || align=right | 3.3 km || 
|-id=543 bgcolor=#fefefe
| 234543 ||  || — || November 10, 2001 || Socorro || LINEAR || — || align=right | 1.3 km || 
|-id=544 bgcolor=#fefefe
| 234544 ||  || — || November 9, 2001 || Socorro || LINEAR || — || align=right | 1.3 km || 
|-id=545 bgcolor=#fefefe
| 234545 ||  || — || November 9, 2001 || Socorro || LINEAR || NYS || align=right data-sort-value="0.81" | 810 m || 
|-id=546 bgcolor=#E9E9E9
| 234546 ||  || — || November 9, 2001 || Socorro || LINEAR || — || align=right | 2.0 km || 
|-id=547 bgcolor=#fefefe
| 234547 ||  || — || November 10, 2001 || Socorro || LINEAR || NYS || align=right | 1.0 km || 
|-id=548 bgcolor=#fefefe
| 234548 ||  || — || November 10, 2001 || Socorro || LINEAR || NYS || align=right data-sort-value="0.90" | 900 m || 
|-id=549 bgcolor=#d6d6d6
| 234549 ||  || — || November 15, 2001 || Socorro || LINEAR || EMA || align=right | 5.8 km || 
|-id=550 bgcolor=#fefefe
| 234550 ||  || — || November 12, 2001 || Socorro || LINEAR || NYS || align=right data-sort-value="0.87" | 870 m || 
|-id=551 bgcolor=#fefefe
| 234551 ||  || — || November 12, 2001 || Socorro || LINEAR || FLO || align=right data-sort-value="0.92" | 920 m || 
|-id=552 bgcolor=#fefefe
| 234552 ||  || — || November 12, 2001 || Socorro || LINEAR || NYS || align=right data-sort-value="0.93" | 930 m || 
|-id=553 bgcolor=#fefefe
| 234553 ||  || — || November 17, 2001 || Socorro || LINEAR || MAS || align=right | 2.1 km || 
|-id=554 bgcolor=#fefefe
| 234554 ||  || — || November 17, 2001 || Socorro || LINEAR || CHL || align=right | 2.9 km || 
|-id=555 bgcolor=#fefefe
| 234555 ||  || — || November 17, 2001 || Socorro || LINEAR || V || align=right data-sort-value="0.92" | 920 m || 
|-id=556 bgcolor=#fefefe
| 234556 ||  || — || November 17, 2001 || Socorro || LINEAR || FLO || align=right | 1.6 km || 
|-id=557 bgcolor=#fefefe
| 234557 ||  || — || November 18, 2001 || Kitt Peak || Spacewatch || V || align=right data-sort-value="0.87" | 870 m || 
|-id=558 bgcolor=#E9E9E9
| 234558 ||  || — || November 17, 2001 || Socorro || LINEAR || — || align=right | 1.6 km || 
|-id=559 bgcolor=#fefefe
| 234559 ||  || — || November 19, 2001 || Socorro || LINEAR || NYS || align=right | 2.9 km || 
|-id=560 bgcolor=#fefefe
| 234560 ||  || — || November 19, 2001 || Socorro || LINEAR || — || align=right | 1.1 km || 
|-id=561 bgcolor=#d6d6d6
| 234561 ||  || — || November 20, 2001 || Socorro || LINEAR || HYG || align=right | 5.4 km || 
|-id=562 bgcolor=#fefefe
| 234562 ||  || — || November 21, 2001 || Socorro || LINEAR || MAS || align=right data-sort-value="0.98" | 980 m || 
|-id=563 bgcolor=#fefefe
| 234563 ||  || — || December 9, 2001 || Socorro || LINEAR || — || align=right | 1.4 km || 
|-id=564 bgcolor=#E9E9E9
| 234564 ||  || — || December 9, 2001 || Socorro || LINEAR || — || align=right | 1.5 km || 
|-id=565 bgcolor=#fefefe
| 234565 ||  || — || December 13, 2001 || Socorro || LINEAR || H || align=right | 1.1 km || 
|-id=566 bgcolor=#fefefe
| 234566 ||  || — || December 10, 2001 || Socorro || LINEAR || MAS || align=right data-sort-value="0.92" | 920 m || 
|-id=567 bgcolor=#fefefe
| 234567 ||  || — || December 10, 2001 || Socorro || LINEAR || — || align=right | 1.6 km || 
|-id=568 bgcolor=#fefefe
| 234568 ||  || — || December 11, 2001 || Socorro || LINEAR || — || align=right | 1.7 km || 
|-id=569 bgcolor=#fefefe
| 234569 ||  || — || December 10, 2001 || Socorro || LINEAR || — || align=right | 1.7 km || 
|-id=570 bgcolor=#fefefe
| 234570 ||  || — || December 10, 2001 || Socorro || LINEAR || — || align=right | 2.5 km || 
|-id=571 bgcolor=#fefefe
| 234571 ||  || — || December 10, 2001 || Socorro || LINEAR || — || align=right data-sort-value="0.89" | 890 m || 
|-id=572 bgcolor=#fefefe
| 234572 ||  || — || December 11, 2001 || Socorro || LINEAR || — || align=right | 1.4 km || 
|-id=573 bgcolor=#fefefe
| 234573 ||  || — || December 14, 2001 || Socorro || LINEAR || NYS || align=right data-sort-value="0.88" | 880 m || 
|-id=574 bgcolor=#fefefe
| 234574 ||  || — || December 14, 2001 || Socorro || LINEAR || MAS || align=right | 1.0 km || 
|-id=575 bgcolor=#fefefe
| 234575 ||  || — || December 14, 2001 || Socorro || LINEAR || — || align=right | 1.1 km || 
|-id=576 bgcolor=#fefefe
| 234576 ||  || — || December 14, 2001 || Socorro || LINEAR || NYS || align=right data-sort-value="0.90" | 900 m || 
|-id=577 bgcolor=#fefefe
| 234577 ||  || — || December 14, 2001 || Socorro || LINEAR || — || align=right | 2.7 km || 
|-id=578 bgcolor=#fefefe
| 234578 ||  || — || December 14, 2001 || Socorro || LINEAR || NYS || align=right data-sort-value="0.85" | 850 m || 
|-id=579 bgcolor=#fefefe
| 234579 ||  || — || December 14, 2001 || Socorro || LINEAR || NYS || align=right | 1.1 km || 
|-id=580 bgcolor=#fefefe
| 234580 ||  || — || December 15, 2001 || Socorro || LINEAR || NYS || align=right data-sort-value="0.81" | 810 m || 
|-id=581 bgcolor=#fefefe
| 234581 ||  || — || December 15, 2001 || Socorro || LINEAR || NYS || align=right data-sort-value="0.85" | 850 m || 
|-id=582 bgcolor=#fefefe
| 234582 ||  || — || December 14, 2001 || Socorro || LINEAR || NYS || align=right data-sort-value="0.93" | 930 m || 
|-id=583 bgcolor=#fefefe
| 234583 ||  || — || December 14, 2001 || Socorro || LINEAR || NYS || align=right | 1.1 km || 
|-id=584 bgcolor=#fefefe
| 234584 ||  || — || December 7, 2001 || Socorro || LINEAR || — || align=right | 1.5 km || 
|-id=585 bgcolor=#fefefe
| 234585 ||  || — || December 11, 2001 || Kitt Peak || Spacewatch || — || align=right data-sort-value="0.83" | 830 m || 
|-id=586 bgcolor=#fefefe
| 234586 ||  || — || December 13, 2001 || Palomar || NEAT || MAS || align=right data-sort-value="0.78" | 780 m || 
|-id=587 bgcolor=#fefefe
| 234587 ||  || — || December 17, 2001 || Socorro || LINEAR || H || align=right | 1.1 km || 
|-id=588 bgcolor=#fefefe
| 234588 ||  || — || December 18, 2001 || Socorro || LINEAR || MASfast? || align=right data-sort-value="0.79" | 790 m || 
|-id=589 bgcolor=#E9E9E9
| 234589 ||  || — || December 18, 2001 || Socorro || LINEAR || — || align=right | 2.1 km || 
|-id=590 bgcolor=#fefefe
| 234590 ||  || — || December 18, 2001 || Socorro || LINEAR || NYS || align=right data-sort-value="0.90" | 900 m || 
|-id=591 bgcolor=#fefefe
| 234591 ||  || — || December 18, 2001 || Socorro || LINEAR || MAS || align=right data-sort-value="0.85" | 850 m || 
|-id=592 bgcolor=#fefefe
| 234592 ||  || — || December 18, 2001 || Socorro || LINEAR || NYS || align=right | 1.1 km || 
|-id=593 bgcolor=#fefefe
| 234593 ||  || — || December 18, 2001 || Socorro || LINEAR || V || align=right | 1.1 km || 
|-id=594 bgcolor=#fefefe
| 234594 ||  || — || December 18, 2001 || Socorro || LINEAR || — || align=right | 1.4 km || 
|-id=595 bgcolor=#fefefe
| 234595 ||  || — || December 18, 2001 || Socorro || LINEAR || KLI || align=right | 3.1 km || 
|-id=596 bgcolor=#fefefe
| 234596 ||  || — || December 18, 2001 || Kitt Peak || Spacewatch || MAS || align=right data-sort-value="0.96" | 960 m || 
|-id=597 bgcolor=#E9E9E9
| 234597 ||  || — || December 17, 2001 || Socorro || LINEAR || — || align=right | 1.5 km || 
|-id=598 bgcolor=#fefefe
| 234598 ||  || — || December 17, 2001 || Socorro || LINEAR || — || align=right | 1.5 km || 
|-id=599 bgcolor=#fefefe
| 234599 ||  || — || December 17, 2001 || Socorro || LINEAR || — || align=right | 1.6 km || 
|-id=600 bgcolor=#E9E9E9
| 234600 ||  || — || December 24, 2001 || Haleakala || NEAT || — || align=right | 2.8 km || 
|}

234601–234700 

|-bgcolor=#fefefe
| 234601 ||  || — || December 19, 2001 || Palomar || NEAT || — || align=right | 3.6 km || 
|-id=602 bgcolor=#E9E9E9
| 234602 ||  || — || December 19, 2001 || Palomar || NEAT || — || align=right | 4.2 km || 
|-id=603 bgcolor=#fefefe
| 234603 ||  || — || January 9, 2002 || Socorro || LINEAR || V || align=right data-sort-value="0.89" | 890 m || 
|-id=604 bgcolor=#E9E9E9
| 234604 ||  || — || January 9, 2002 || Socorro || LINEAR || — || align=right | 2.9 km || 
|-id=605 bgcolor=#fefefe
| 234605 ||  || — || January 9, 2002 || Socorro || LINEAR || — || align=right | 3.1 km || 
|-id=606 bgcolor=#fefefe
| 234606 ||  || — || January 9, 2002 || Socorro || LINEAR || NYS || align=right data-sort-value="0.73" | 730 m || 
|-id=607 bgcolor=#fefefe
| 234607 ||  || — || January 9, 2002 || Socorro || LINEAR || — || align=right | 1.4 km || 
|-id=608 bgcolor=#fefefe
| 234608 ||  || — || January 9, 2002 || Socorro || LINEAR || NYS || align=right data-sort-value="0.83" | 830 m || 
|-id=609 bgcolor=#fefefe
| 234609 ||  || — || January 9, 2002 || Socorro || LINEAR || NYS || align=right data-sort-value="0.79" | 790 m || 
|-id=610 bgcolor=#fefefe
| 234610 ||  || — || January 9, 2002 || Socorro || LINEAR || V || align=right | 1.0 km || 
|-id=611 bgcolor=#fefefe
| 234611 ||  || — || January 9, 2002 || Campo Imperatore || CINEOS || NYS || align=right data-sort-value="0.77" | 770 m || 
|-id=612 bgcolor=#fefefe
| 234612 ||  || — || January 8, 2002 || Socorro || LINEAR || NYS || align=right data-sort-value="0.85" | 850 m || 
|-id=613 bgcolor=#fefefe
| 234613 ||  || — || January 9, 2002 || Socorro || LINEAR || NYS || align=right data-sort-value="0.94" | 940 m || 
|-id=614 bgcolor=#fefefe
| 234614 ||  || — || January 13, 2002 || Socorro || LINEAR || MAS || align=right data-sort-value="0.79" | 790 m || 
|-id=615 bgcolor=#fefefe
| 234615 ||  || — || January 8, 2002 || Socorro || LINEAR || NYS || align=right | 1.1 km || 
|-id=616 bgcolor=#fefefe
| 234616 ||  || — || January 8, 2002 || Socorro || LINEAR || — || align=right | 1.2 km || 
|-id=617 bgcolor=#fefefe
| 234617 ||  || — || January 8, 2002 || Socorro || LINEAR || NYS || align=right | 1.3 km || 
|-id=618 bgcolor=#fefefe
| 234618 ||  || — || January 8, 2002 || Socorro || LINEAR || — || align=right | 1.5 km || 
|-id=619 bgcolor=#fefefe
| 234619 ||  || — || January 9, 2002 || Socorro || LINEAR || NYS || align=right data-sort-value="0.81" | 810 m || 
|-id=620 bgcolor=#E9E9E9
| 234620 ||  || — || January 8, 2002 || Socorro || LINEAR || — || align=right | 1.4 km || 
|-id=621 bgcolor=#fefefe
| 234621 ||  || — || January 13, 2002 || Socorro || LINEAR || NYS || align=right | 2.4 km || 
|-id=622 bgcolor=#fefefe
| 234622 ||  || — || January 13, 2002 || Socorro || LINEAR || — || align=right | 1.1 km || 
|-id=623 bgcolor=#fefefe
| 234623 ||  || — || January 14, 2002 || Socorro || LINEAR || — || align=right | 1.8 km || 
|-id=624 bgcolor=#fefefe
| 234624 ||  || — || January 8, 2002 || Socorro || LINEAR || — || align=right | 1.2 km || 
|-id=625 bgcolor=#fefefe
| 234625 ||  || — || January 8, 2002 || Socorro || LINEAR || V || align=right | 1.2 km || 
|-id=626 bgcolor=#fefefe
| 234626 ||  || — || January 14, 2002 || Socorro || LINEAR || V || align=right | 1.7 km || 
|-id=627 bgcolor=#fefefe
| 234627 ||  || — || January 18, 2002 || Socorro || LINEAR || — || align=right | 1.7 km || 
|-id=628 bgcolor=#fefefe
| 234628 ||  || — || January 19, 2002 || Socorro || LINEAR || ERI || align=right | 2.9 km || 
|-id=629 bgcolor=#E9E9E9
| 234629 ||  || — || January 23, 2002 || Socorro || LINEAR || — || align=right | 2.1 km || 
|-id=630 bgcolor=#fefefe
| 234630 ||  || — || February 2, 2002 || Cima Ekar || ADAS || — || align=right | 1.5 km || 
|-id=631 bgcolor=#E9E9E9
| 234631 ||  || — || February 6, 2002 || Oaxaca || J. M. Roe || — || align=right | 1.1 km || 
|-id=632 bgcolor=#fefefe
| 234632 ||  || — || February 6, 2002 || Palomar || NEAT || H || align=right data-sort-value="0.84" | 840 m || 
|-id=633 bgcolor=#fefefe
| 234633 ||  || — || February 7, 2002 || Socorro || LINEAR || H || align=right | 1.2 km || 
|-id=634 bgcolor=#fefefe
| 234634 ||  || — || February 8, 2002 || Črni Vrh || Črni Vrh || — || align=right | 1.3 km || 
|-id=635 bgcolor=#fefefe
| 234635 ||  || — || February 6, 2002 || Socorro || LINEAR || V || align=right | 1.2 km || 
|-id=636 bgcolor=#E9E9E9
| 234636 ||  || — || February 7, 2002 || Socorro || LINEAR || — || align=right | 3.9 km || 
|-id=637 bgcolor=#E9E9E9
| 234637 ||  || — || February 7, 2002 || Bohyunsan || Bohyunsan Obs. || — || align=right | 1.2 km || 
|-id=638 bgcolor=#E9E9E9
| 234638 ||  || — || February 10, 2002 || Socorro || LINEAR || — || align=right | 1.8 km || 
|-id=639 bgcolor=#fefefe
| 234639 ||  || — || February 7, 2002 || Socorro || LINEAR || NYS || align=right | 1.1 km || 
|-id=640 bgcolor=#E9E9E9
| 234640 ||  || — || February 9, 2002 || Anderson Mesa || LONEOS || — || align=right | 3.0 km || 
|-id=641 bgcolor=#fefefe
| 234641 ||  || — || February 7, 2002 || Socorro || LINEAR || MAS || align=right data-sort-value="0.97" | 970 m || 
|-id=642 bgcolor=#fefefe
| 234642 ||  || — || February 10, 2002 || Socorro || LINEAR || MAS || align=right data-sort-value="0.89" | 890 m || 
|-id=643 bgcolor=#fefefe
| 234643 ||  || — || February 10, 2002 || Socorro || LINEAR || MAS || align=right data-sort-value="0.95" | 950 m || 
|-id=644 bgcolor=#E9E9E9
| 234644 ||  || — || February 10, 2002 || Socorro || LINEAR || — || align=right | 2.4 km || 
|-id=645 bgcolor=#fefefe
| 234645 ||  || — || February 10, 2002 || Socorro || LINEAR || V || align=right data-sort-value="0.99" | 990 m || 
|-id=646 bgcolor=#fefefe
| 234646 ||  || — || February 10, 2002 || Socorro || LINEAR || MAS || align=right data-sort-value="0.76" | 760 m || 
|-id=647 bgcolor=#fefefe
| 234647 ||  || — || February 3, 2002 || Palomar || NEAT || — || align=right | 1.4 km || 
|-id=648 bgcolor=#fefefe
| 234648 ||  || — || February 5, 2002 || Palomar || NEAT || — || align=right | 1.3 km || 
|-id=649 bgcolor=#fefefe
| 234649 ||  || — || February 9, 2002 || Kitt Peak || Spacewatch || — || align=right | 1.6 km || 
|-id=650 bgcolor=#d6d6d6
| 234650 ||  || — || February 14, 2002 || Kitt Peak || Spacewatch || 3:2 || align=right | 6.5 km || 
|-id=651 bgcolor=#E9E9E9
| 234651 ||  || — || February 15, 2002 || Bohyunsan || Bohyunsan Obs. || — || align=right | 1.4 km || 
|-id=652 bgcolor=#fefefe
| 234652 ||  || — || February 24, 2002 || Palomar || NEAT || H || align=right data-sort-value="0.70" | 700 m || 
|-id=653 bgcolor=#fefefe
| 234653 ||  || — || March 9, 2002 || Socorro || LINEAR || H || align=right data-sort-value="0.86" | 860 m || 
|-id=654 bgcolor=#E9E9E9
| 234654 ||  || — || March 11, 2002 || Cima Ekar || ADAS || — || align=right | 3.2 km || 
|-id=655 bgcolor=#fefefe
| 234655 ||  || — || March 12, 2002 || Kitt Peak || Spacewatch || NYS || align=right | 2.8 km || 
|-id=656 bgcolor=#fefefe
| 234656 ||  || — || March 13, 2002 || Socorro || LINEAR || — || align=right data-sort-value="0.96" | 960 m || 
|-id=657 bgcolor=#E9E9E9
| 234657 ||  || — || March 9, 2002 || Kitt Peak || Spacewatch || — || align=right | 4.7 km || 
|-id=658 bgcolor=#fefefe
| 234658 ||  || — || March 9, 2002 || Kitt Peak || Spacewatch || MAS || align=right data-sort-value="0.82" | 820 m || 
|-id=659 bgcolor=#E9E9E9
| 234659 ||  || — || March 10, 2002 || Anderson Mesa || LONEOS || — || align=right | 1.3 km || 
|-id=660 bgcolor=#E9E9E9
| 234660 ||  || — || March 12, 2002 || Palomar || NEAT || — || align=right | 1.4 km || 
|-id=661 bgcolor=#E9E9E9
| 234661 ||  || — || March 13, 2002 || Socorro || LINEAR || — || align=right | 2.3 km || 
|-id=662 bgcolor=#E9E9E9
| 234662 ||  || — || March 12, 2002 || Kitt Peak || Spacewatch || — || align=right | 1.1 km || 
|-id=663 bgcolor=#E9E9E9
| 234663 ||  || — || March 13, 2002 || Socorro || LINEAR || — || align=right | 1.6 km || 
|-id=664 bgcolor=#fefefe
| 234664 ||  || — || March 14, 2002 || Anderson Mesa || LONEOS || — || align=right | 1.8 km || 
|-id=665 bgcolor=#E9E9E9
| 234665 ||  || — || March 15, 2002 || Palomar || NEAT || — || align=right | 1.5 km || 
|-id=666 bgcolor=#E9E9E9
| 234666 ||  || — || March 16, 2002 || Socorro || LINEAR || — || align=right | 1.8 km || 
|-id=667 bgcolor=#E9E9E9
| 234667 ||  || — || March 20, 2002 || Socorro || LINEAR || ADE || align=right | 5.3 km || 
|-id=668 bgcolor=#E9E9E9
| 234668 ||  || — || March 20, 2002 || Socorro || LINEAR || — || align=right | 2.0 km || 
|-id=669 bgcolor=#E9E9E9
| 234669 ||  || — || March 20, 2002 || Anderson Mesa || LONEOS || — || align=right | 1.6 km || 
|-id=670 bgcolor=#fefefe
| 234670 || 2002 GM || — || April 2, 2002 || Kvistaberg || UDAS || H || align=right data-sort-value="0.85" | 850 m || 
|-id=671 bgcolor=#fefefe
| 234671 ||  || — || April 8, 2002 || Palomar || NEAT || H || align=right | 1.0 km || 
|-id=672 bgcolor=#E9E9E9
| 234672 ||  || — || April 14, 2002 || Socorro || LINEAR || — || align=right | 1.3 km || 
|-id=673 bgcolor=#fefefe
| 234673 ||  || — || April 15, 2002 || Socorro || LINEAR || H || align=right | 1.2 km || 
|-id=674 bgcolor=#d6d6d6
| 234674 ||  || — || April 2, 2002 || Kitt Peak || Spacewatch || HIL3:2 || align=right | 7.7 km || 
|-id=675 bgcolor=#E9E9E9
| 234675 ||  || — || April 4, 2002 || Palomar || NEAT || KON || align=right | 3.1 km || 
|-id=676 bgcolor=#E9E9E9
| 234676 ||  || — || April 5, 2002 || Palomar || NEAT || — || align=right | 1.4 km || 
|-id=677 bgcolor=#E9E9E9
| 234677 ||  || — || April 5, 2002 || Anderson Mesa || LONEOS || — || align=right | 3.6 km || 
|-id=678 bgcolor=#E9E9E9
| 234678 ||  || — || April 8, 2002 || Palomar || NEAT || — || align=right | 1.4 km || 
|-id=679 bgcolor=#E9E9E9
| 234679 ||  || — || April 8, 2002 || Palomar || NEAT || — || align=right | 2.0 km || 
|-id=680 bgcolor=#E9E9E9
| 234680 ||  || — || April 8, 2002 || Palomar || NEAT || — || align=right | 1.6 km || 
|-id=681 bgcolor=#E9E9E9
| 234681 ||  || — || April 10, 2002 || Socorro || LINEAR || — || align=right | 1.5 km || 
|-id=682 bgcolor=#E9E9E9
| 234682 ||  || — || April 10, 2002 || Socorro || LINEAR || — || align=right | 2.1 km || 
|-id=683 bgcolor=#E9E9E9
| 234683 ||  || — || April 10, 2002 || Socorro || LINEAR || — || align=right | 2.8 km || 
|-id=684 bgcolor=#E9E9E9
| 234684 ||  || — || April 10, 2002 || Palomar || NEAT || — || align=right | 1.3 km || 
|-id=685 bgcolor=#E9E9E9
| 234685 ||  || — || April 9, 2002 || Kitt Peak || Spacewatch || MIS || align=right | 2.2 km || 
|-id=686 bgcolor=#E9E9E9
| 234686 ||  || — || April 10, 2002 || Socorro || LINEAR || — || align=right | 1.1 km || 
|-id=687 bgcolor=#E9E9E9
| 234687 ||  || — || April 10, 2002 || Socorro || LINEAR || — || align=right | 2.4 km || 
|-id=688 bgcolor=#E9E9E9
| 234688 ||  || — || April 10, 2002 || Socorro || LINEAR || — || align=right | 2.6 km || 
|-id=689 bgcolor=#E9E9E9
| 234689 ||  || — || April 10, 2002 || Socorro || LINEAR || — || align=right | 2.7 km || 
|-id=690 bgcolor=#E9E9E9
| 234690 ||  || — || April 10, 2002 || Palomar || NEAT || — || align=right | 3.6 km || 
|-id=691 bgcolor=#E9E9E9
| 234691 ||  || — || April 11, 2002 || Socorro || LINEAR || — || align=right | 1.3 km || 
|-id=692 bgcolor=#E9E9E9
| 234692 ||  || — || April 12, 2002 || Palomar || NEAT || — || align=right | 1.3 km || 
|-id=693 bgcolor=#fefefe
| 234693 ||  || — || April 12, 2002 || Socorro || LINEAR || — || align=right | 1.6 km || 
|-id=694 bgcolor=#E9E9E9
| 234694 ||  || — || April 12, 2002 || Socorro || LINEAR || — || align=right | 1.9 km || 
|-id=695 bgcolor=#E9E9E9
| 234695 ||  || — || April 12, 2002 || Socorro || LINEAR || JUL || align=right | 1.3 km || 
|-id=696 bgcolor=#E9E9E9
| 234696 ||  || — || April 12, 2002 || Socorro || LINEAR || — || align=right | 1.2 km || 
|-id=697 bgcolor=#E9E9E9
| 234697 ||  || — || April 12, 2002 || Socorro || LINEAR || — || align=right | 1.9 km || 
|-id=698 bgcolor=#E9E9E9
| 234698 ||  || — || April 13, 2002 || Palomar || NEAT || — || align=right | 1.9 km || 
|-id=699 bgcolor=#E9E9E9
| 234699 ||  || — || April 11, 2002 || Palomar || NEAT || EUN || align=right | 2.0 km || 
|-id=700 bgcolor=#E9E9E9
| 234700 ||  || — || April 12, 2002 || Palomar || NEAT || PAD || align=right | 3.2 km || 
|}

234701–234800 

|-bgcolor=#E9E9E9
| 234701 ||  || — || April 13, 2002 || Palomar || NEAT || — || align=right | 1.5 km || 
|-id=702 bgcolor=#E9E9E9
| 234702 ||  || — || April 13, 2002 || Palomar || NEAT || — || align=right | 1.2 km || 
|-id=703 bgcolor=#E9E9E9
| 234703 ||  || — || April 14, 2002 || Socorro || LINEAR || — || align=right | 2.5 km || 
|-id=704 bgcolor=#E9E9E9
| 234704 ||  || — || April 14, 2002 || Palomar || NEAT || — || align=right | 2.5 km || 
|-id=705 bgcolor=#E9E9E9
| 234705 ||  || — || April 9, 2002 || Socorro || LINEAR || — || align=right | 1.9 km || 
|-id=706 bgcolor=#E9E9E9
| 234706 ||  || — || April 10, 2002 || Socorro || LINEAR || — || align=right | 1.7 km || 
|-id=707 bgcolor=#E9E9E9
| 234707 ||  || — || April 17, 2002 || Socorro || LINEAR || — || align=right | 2.5 km || 
|-id=708 bgcolor=#fefefe
| 234708 ||  || — || April 21, 2002 || Socorro || LINEAR || H || align=right data-sort-value="0.96" | 960 m || 
|-id=709 bgcolor=#E9E9E9
| 234709 ||  || — || May 3, 2002 || Palomar || NEAT || — || align=right | 1.4 km || 
|-id=710 bgcolor=#E9E9E9
| 234710 ||  || — || May 6, 2002 || Palomar || NEAT || — || align=right | 1.7 km || 
|-id=711 bgcolor=#E9E9E9
| 234711 ||  || — || May 7, 2002 || Palomar || NEAT || — || align=right | 2.0 km || 
|-id=712 bgcolor=#E9E9E9
| 234712 ||  || — || May 7, 2002 || Palomar || NEAT || — || align=right | 1.3 km || 
|-id=713 bgcolor=#E9E9E9
| 234713 ||  || — || May 7, 2002 || Anderson Mesa || LONEOS || — || align=right | 3.1 km || 
|-id=714 bgcolor=#E9E9E9
| 234714 ||  || — || May 11, 2002 || Tebbutt || F. B. Zoltowski || — || align=right | 2.6 km || 
|-id=715 bgcolor=#E9E9E9
| 234715 ||  || — || May 11, 2002 || Socorro || LINEAR || JUN || align=right | 1.8 km || 
|-id=716 bgcolor=#E9E9E9
| 234716 ||  || — || May 11, 2002 || Socorro || LINEAR || HOF || align=right | 3.5 km || 
|-id=717 bgcolor=#E9E9E9
| 234717 ||  || — || May 11, 2002 || Socorro || LINEAR || RAF || align=right | 1.4 km || 
|-id=718 bgcolor=#E9E9E9
| 234718 ||  || — || May 13, 2002 || Palomar || NEAT || MAR || align=right | 1.8 km || 
|-id=719 bgcolor=#E9E9E9
| 234719 ||  || — || May 5, 2002 || Anderson Mesa || LONEOS || — || align=right | 2.2 km || 
|-id=720 bgcolor=#E9E9E9
| 234720 ||  || — || May 5, 2002 || Anderson Mesa || LONEOS || — || align=right | 2.8 km || 
|-id=721 bgcolor=#E9E9E9
| 234721 ||  || — || May 5, 2002 || Palomar || NEAT || MAR || align=right | 1.7 km || 
|-id=722 bgcolor=#E9E9E9
| 234722 ||  || — || May 7, 2002 || Palomar || NEAT || EUN || align=right | 1.8 km || 
|-id=723 bgcolor=#E9E9E9
| 234723 ||  || — || May 9, 2002 || Palomar || NEAT || — || align=right | 2.3 km || 
|-id=724 bgcolor=#E9E9E9
| 234724 ||  || — || May 13, 2002 || Socorro || LINEAR || — || align=right | 1.5 km || 
|-id=725 bgcolor=#E9E9E9
| 234725 ||  || — || May 21, 2002 || Socorro || LINEAR || — || align=right | 4.0 km || 
|-id=726 bgcolor=#E9E9E9
| 234726 ||  || — || May 17, 2002 || Kitt Peak || Spacewatch || WIT || align=right | 1.4 km || 
|-id=727 bgcolor=#E9E9E9
| 234727 ||  || — || May 17, 2002 || Kitt Peak || Spacewatch || — || align=right | 2.1 km || 
|-id=728 bgcolor=#E9E9E9
| 234728 ||  || — || May 19, 2002 || Palomar || NEAT || — || align=right | 1.7 km || 
|-id=729 bgcolor=#E9E9E9
| 234729 ||  || — || May 23, 2002 || Palomar || NEAT || — || align=right | 2.9 km || 
|-id=730 bgcolor=#E9E9E9
| 234730 ||  || — || June 2, 2002 || Palomar || NEAT || — || align=right | 3.0 km || 
|-id=731 bgcolor=#d6d6d6
| 234731 ||  || — || June 8, 2002 || Socorro || LINEAR || — || align=right | 4.6 km || 
|-id=732 bgcolor=#E9E9E9
| 234732 ||  || — || June 3, 2002 || Palomar || NEAT || — || align=right | 1.7 km || 
|-id=733 bgcolor=#E9E9E9
| 234733 ||  || — || June 3, 2002 || Palomar || NEAT || ADE || align=right | 3.3 km || 
|-id=734 bgcolor=#E9E9E9
| 234734 ||  || — || June 10, 2002 || Socorro || LINEAR || — || align=right | 2.4 km || 
|-id=735 bgcolor=#E9E9E9
| 234735 ||  || — || June 9, 2002 || Socorro || LINEAR || — || align=right | 2.7 km || 
|-id=736 bgcolor=#E9E9E9
| 234736 ||  || — || June 10, 2002 || Socorro || LINEAR || — || align=right | 2.3 km || 
|-id=737 bgcolor=#E9E9E9
| 234737 ||  || — || June 12, 2002 || Socorro || LINEAR || — || align=right | 2.1 km || 
|-id=738 bgcolor=#E9E9E9
| 234738 ||  || — || June 8, 2002 || Socorro || LINEAR || — || align=right | 4.5 km || 
|-id=739 bgcolor=#E9E9E9
| 234739 ||  || — || June 8, 2002 || Kitt Peak || Spacewatch || — || align=right | 1.4 km || 
|-id=740 bgcolor=#E9E9E9
| 234740 ||  || — || June 11, 2002 || Kitt Peak || Spacewatch || — || align=right | 3.0 km || 
|-id=741 bgcolor=#E9E9E9
| 234741 ||  || — || June 10, 2002 || Palomar || NEAT || — || align=right | 1.9 km || 
|-id=742 bgcolor=#d6d6d6
| 234742 ||  || — || June 12, 2002 || Palomar || NEAT || — || align=right | 6.3 km || 
|-id=743 bgcolor=#E9E9E9
| 234743 ||  || — || July 4, 2002 || Palomar || NEAT || — || align=right | 3.4 km || 
|-id=744 bgcolor=#E9E9E9
| 234744 ||  || — || July 5, 2002 || Socorro || LINEAR || JUN || align=right | 1.4 km || 
|-id=745 bgcolor=#E9E9E9
| 234745 ||  || — || July 12, 2002 || Palomar || NEAT || JUN || align=right | 1.5 km || 
|-id=746 bgcolor=#E9E9E9
| 234746 ||  || — || July 14, 2002 || Palomar || NEAT || NEM || align=right | 3.1 km || 
|-id=747 bgcolor=#E9E9E9
| 234747 ||  || — || July 12, 2002 || Palomar || NEAT || MAR || align=right | 1.7 km || 
|-id=748 bgcolor=#E9E9E9
| 234748 ||  || — || July 12, 2002 || Palomar || R. M. Stoss || — || align=right | 2.6 km || 
|-id=749 bgcolor=#E9E9E9
| 234749 ||  || — || July 6, 2002 || Palomar || NEAT || — || align=right | 2.9 km || 
|-id=750 bgcolor=#d6d6d6
| 234750 Amymainzer ||  ||  || July 8, 2002 || Palomar || NEAT || — || align=right | 7.5 km || 
|-id=751 bgcolor=#d6d6d6
| 234751 ||  || — || July 14, 2002 || Palomar || NEAT || EOS || align=right | 5.2 km || 
|-id=752 bgcolor=#E9E9E9
| 234752 ||  || — || July 12, 2002 || Palomar || NEAT || WIT || align=right | 1.3 km || 
|-id=753 bgcolor=#d6d6d6
| 234753 ||  || — || July 17, 2002 || Socorro || LINEAR || — || align=right | 6.0 km || 
|-id=754 bgcolor=#E9E9E9
| 234754 ||  || — || July 19, 2002 || Palomar || NEAT || — || align=right | 2.5 km || 
|-id=755 bgcolor=#d6d6d6
| 234755 ||  || — || July 20, 2002 || Palomar || NEAT || — || align=right | 4.7 km || 
|-id=756 bgcolor=#E9E9E9
| 234756 ||  || — || July 18, 2002 || Socorro || LINEAR || — || align=right | 3.6 km || 
|-id=757 bgcolor=#E9E9E9
| 234757 ||  || — || July 18, 2002 || Socorro || LINEAR || — || align=right | 2.7 km || 
|-id=758 bgcolor=#E9E9E9
| 234758 ||  || — || July 18, 2002 || Palomar || NEAT || — || align=right | 2.9 km || 
|-id=759 bgcolor=#E9E9E9
| 234759 ||  || — || July 16, 2002 || Palomar || NEAT || — || align=right | 1.8 km || 
|-id=760 bgcolor=#d6d6d6
| 234760 ||  || — || July 20, 2002 || Palomar || NEAT || — || align=right | 6.4 km || 
|-id=761 bgcolor=#E9E9E9
| 234761 Rainerkracht ||  ||  || July 22, 2002 || Palomar || NEAT || — || align=right | 1.9 km || 
|-id=762 bgcolor=#E9E9E9
| 234762 ||  || — || August 4, 2002 || Socorro || LINEAR || — || align=right | 3.8 km || 
|-id=763 bgcolor=#d6d6d6
| 234763 ||  || — || August 5, 2002 || Palomar || NEAT || — || align=right | 5.0 km || 
|-id=764 bgcolor=#d6d6d6
| 234764 ||  || — || August 6, 2002 || Palomar || NEAT || EUP || align=right | 4.6 km || 
|-id=765 bgcolor=#E9E9E9
| 234765 ||  || — || August 6, 2002 || Palomar || NEAT || — || align=right | 3.0 km || 
|-id=766 bgcolor=#E9E9E9
| 234766 ||  || — || August 5, 2002 || Socorro || LINEAR || JUN || align=right | 4.2 km || 
|-id=767 bgcolor=#E9E9E9
| 234767 ||  || — || August 10, 2002 || Socorro || LINEAR || — || align=right | 3.6 km || 
|-id=768 bgcolor=#d6d6d6
| 234768 ||  || — || August 6, 2002 || Palomar || NEAT || URS || align=right | 6.1 km || 
|-id=769 bgcolor=#E9E9E9
| 234769 ||  || — || August 6, 2002 || Palomar || NEAT || HOF || align=right | 4.0 km || 
|-id=770 bgcolor=#E9E9E9
| 234770 ||  || — || August 12, 2002 || Socorro || LINEAR || — || align=right | 4.2 km || 
|-id=771 bgcolor=#E9E9E9
| 234771 ||  || — || August 11, 2002 || Palomar || NEAT || BRU || align=right | 3.5 km || 
|-id=772 bgcolor=#E9E9E9
| 234772 ||  || — || August 14, 2002 || Socorro || LINEAR || — || align=right | 2.9 km || 
|-id=773 bgcolor=#d6d6d6
| 234773 ||  || — || August 13, 2002 || Anderson Mesa || LONEOS || — || align=right | 5.0 km || 
|-id=774 bgcolor=#E9E9E9
| 234774 ||  || — || August 15, 2002 || Socorro || LINEAR || — || align=right | 3.7 km || 
|-id=775 bgcolor=#d6d6d6
| 234775 ||  || — || August 14, 2002 || Socorro || LINEAR || CHA || align=right | 2.8 km || 
|-id=776 bgcolor=#E9E9E9
| 234776 ||  || — || August 12, 2002 || Haleakala || NEAT || — || align=right | 3.7 km || 
|-id=777 bgcolor=#d6d6d6
| 234777 ||  || — || August 8, 2002 || Palomar || S. F. Hönig || — || align=right | 4.4 km || 
|-id=778 bgcolor=#E9E9E9
| 234778 ||  || — || August 8, 2002 || Palomar || S. F. Hönig || HOF || align=right | 3.0 km || 
|-id=779 bgcolor=#E9E9E9
| 234779 ||  || — || August 8, 2002 || Palomar || NEAT || — || align=right | 2.4 km || 
|-id=780 bgcolor=#d6d6d6
| 234780 ||  || — || August 15, 2002 || Palomar || NEAT || — || align=right | 3.6 km || 
|-id=781 bgcolor=#d6d6d6
| 234781 ||  || — || August 8, 2002 || Palomar || NEAT || — || align=right | 3.1 km || 
|-id=782 bgcolor=#d6d6d6
| 234782 ||  || — || August 7, 2002 || Palomar || NEAT || CHA || align=right | 3.7 km || 
|-id=783 bgcolor=#d6d6d6
| 234783 ||  || — || August 11, 2002 || Palomar || NEAT || CHA || align=right | 2.9 km || 
|-id=784 bgcolor=#E9E9E9
| 234784 ||  || — || August 8, 2002 || Palomar || NEAT || AGN || align=right | 1.6 km || 
|-id=785 bgcolor=#d6d6d6
| 234785 ||  || — || August 8, 2002 || Palomar || NEAT || KOR || align=right | 1.4 km || 
|-id=786 bgcolor=#E9E9E9
| 234786 ||  || — || August 16, 2002 || Palomar || NEAT || — || align=right | 2.1 km || 
|-id=787 bgcolor=#d6d6d6
| 234787 ||  || — || August 16, 2002 || Haleakala || NEAT || TEL || align=right | 2.0 km || 
|-id=788 bgcolor=#d6d6d6
| 234788 ||  || — || August 28, 2002 || Palomar || NEAT || — || align=right | 4.1 km || 
|-id=789 bgcolor=#d6d6d6
| 234789 ||  || — || August 27, 2002 || Palomar || NEAT || VER || align=right | 6.0 km || 
|-id=790 bgcolor=#d6d6d6
| 234790 ||  || — || August 27, 2002 || Palomar || NEAT || — || align=right | 3.8 km || 
|-id=791 bgcolor=#d6d6d6
| 234791 ||  || — || August 30, 2002 || Kitt Peak || Spacewatch || KOR || align=right | 1.6 km || 
|-id=792 bgcolor=#E9E9E9
| 234792 ||  || — || August 29, 2002 || Palomar || NEAT || — || align=right | 3.4 km || 
|-id=793 bgcolor=#d6d6d6
| 234793 ||  || — || August 29, 2002 || Palomar || R. Matson || KOR || align=right | 2.3 km || 
|-id=794 bgcolor=#d6d6d6
| 234794 ||  || — || August 29, 2002 || Palomar || S. F. Hönig || CRO || align=right | 5.3 km || 
|-id=795 bgcolor=#d6d6d6
| 234795 ||  || — || August 27, 2002 || Palomar || NEAT || KOR || align=right | 1.8 km || 
|-id=796 bgcolor=#E9E9E9
| 234796 ||  || — || August 17, 2002 || Palomar || NEAT || — || align=right | 3.4 km || 
|-id=797 bgcolor=#E9E9E9
| 234797 ||  || — || August 29, 2002 || Palomar || NEAT || MRX || align=right | 1.3 km || 
|-id=798 bgcolor=#d6d6d6
| 234798 ||  || — || August 27, 2002 || Palomar || NEAT || — || align=right | 3.5 km || 
|-id=799 bgcolor=#E9E9E9
| 234799 ||  || — || August 27, 2002 || Palomar || NEAT || AGN || align=right | 1.8 km || 
|-id=800 bgcolor=#E9E9E9
| 234800 ||  || — || August 30, 2002 || Palomar || NEAT || MRX || align=right | 1.4 km || 
|}

234801–234900 

|-bgcolor=#E9E9E9
| 234801 ||  || — || August 27, 2002 || Palomar || NEAT || — || align=right | 2.8 km || 
|-id=802 bgcolor=#d6d6d6
| 234802 ||  || — || August 29, 2002 || Palomar || NEAT || — || align=right | 2.8 km || 
|-id=803 bgcolor=#d6d6d6
| 234803 ||  || — || August 26, 2002 || Palomar || NEAT || — || align=right | 5.2 km || 
|-id=804 bgcolor=#d6d6d6
| 234804 ||  || — || August 16, 2002 || Palomar || NEAT || — || align=right | 4.0 km || 
|-id=805 bgcolor=#d6d6d6
| 234805 ||  || — || August 19, 2002 || Palomar || NEAT || CHA || align=right | 2.7 km || 
|-id=806 bgcolor=#E9E9E9
| 234806 ||  || — || August 19, 2002 || Palomar || NEAT || AGN || align=right | 1.8 km || 
|-id=807 bgcolor=#d6d6d6
| 234807 ||  || — || August 29, 2002 || Palomar || NEAT || — || align=right | 6.1 km || 
|-id=808 bgcolor=#d6d6d6
| 234808 ||  || — || August 18, 2002 || Palomar || NEAT || — || align=right | 3.1 km || 
|-id=809 bgcolor=#E9E9E9
| 234809 ||  || — || August 18, 2002 || Palomar || Palomar Obs. || — || align=right | 2.9 km || 
|-id=810 bgcolor=#d6d6d6
| 234810 ||  || — || August 19, 2002 || Palomar || NEAT || BRA || align=right | 1.7 km || 
|-id=811 bgcolor=#d6d6d6
| 234811 ||  || — || August 20, 2002 || Palomar || NEAT || TIR || align=right | 2.7 km || 
|-id=812 bgcolor=#E9E9E9
| 234812 ||  || — || August 19, 2002 || Palomar || NEAT || — || align=right | 3.1 km || 
|-id=813 bgcolor=#d6d6d6
| 234813 ||  || — || August 17, 2002 || Palomar || NEAT || — || align=right | 2.9 km || 
|-id=814 bgcolor=#E9E9E9
| 234814 ||  || — || August 28, 2002 || Palomar || NEAT || — || align=right | 3.3 km || 
|-id=815 bgcolor=#d6d6d6
| 234815 ||  || — || August 28, 2002 || Palomar || NEAT || — || align=right | 3.3 km || 
|-id=816 bgcolor=#d6d6d6
| 234816 ||  || — || August 29, 2002 || Palomar || NEAT || — || align=right | 2.7 km || 
|-id=817 bgcolor=#d6d6d6
| 234817 ||  || — || August 28, 2002 || Palomar || NEAT || — || align=right | 5.6 km || 
|-id=818 bgcolor=#d6d6d6
| 234818 ||  || — || August 18, 2002 || Palomar || NEAT || KOR || align=right | 1.5 km || 
|-id=819 bgcolor=#d6d6d6
| 234819 ||  || — || September 4, 2002 || Anderson Mesa || LONEOS || — || align=right | 4.3 km || 
|-id=820 bgcolor=#d6d6d6
| 234820 ||  || — || September 4, 2002 || Anderson Mesa || LONEOS || — || align=right | 4.2 km || 
|-id=821 bgcolor=#d6d6d6
| 234821 ||  || — || September 4, 2002 || Anderson Mesa || LONEOS || — || align=right | 3.4 km || 
|-id=822 bgcolor=#d6d6d6
| 234822 ||  || — || September 5, 2002 || Socorro || LINEAR || HYG || align=right | 4.0 km || 
|-id=823 bgcolor=#E9E9E9
| 234823 ||  || — || September 5, 2002 || Anderson Mesa || LONEOS || — || align=right | 3.2 km || 
|-id=824 bgcolor=#d6d6d6
| 234824 ||  || — || September 5, 2002 || Socorro || LINEAR || — || align=right | 4.0 km || 
|-id=825 bgcolor=#d6d6d6
| 234825 ||  || — || September 5, 2002 || Socorro || LINEAR || — || align=right | 3.3 km || 
|-id=826 bgcolor=#d6d6d6
| 234826 ||  || — || September 5, 2002 || Socorro || LINEAR || EOS || align=right | 3.3 km || 
|-id=827 bgcolor=#E9E9E9
| 234827 ||  || — || September 5, 2002 || Socorro || LINEAR || — || align=right | 3.9 km || 
|-id=828 bgcolor=#d6d6d6
| 234828 ||  || — || September 5, 2002 || Socorro || LINEAR || — || align=right | 2.8 km || 
|-id=829 bgcolor=#E9E9E9
| 234829 ||  || — || September 5, 2002 || Socorro || LINEAR || INO || align=right | 1.9 km || 
|-id=830 bgcolor=#d6d6d6
| 234830 ||  || — || September 6, 2002 || Socorro || LINEAR || — || align=right | 4.8 km || 
|-id=831 bgcolor=#d6d6d6
| 234831 ||  || — || September 3, 2002 || Campo Imperatore || CINEOS || — || align=right | 4.4 km || 
|-id=832 bgcolor=#d6d6d6
| 234832 ||  || — || September 9, 2002 || Campo Imperatore || CINEOS || — || align=right | 4.3 km || 
|-id=833 bgcolor=#d6d6d6
| 234833 ||  || — || September 11, 2002 || Palomar || NEAT || NAE || align=right | 6.1 km || 
|-id=834 bgcolor=#d6d6d6
| 234834 ||  || — || September 10, 2002 || Palomar || NEAT || TIR || align=right | 5.8 km || 
|-id=835 bgcolor=#E9E9E9
| 234835 ||  || — || September 11, 2002 || Haleakala || NEAT || — || align=right | 4.0 km || 
|-id=836 bgcolor=#d6d6d6
| 234836 ||  || — || September 11, 2002 || Palomar || NEAT || — || align=right | 3.6 km || 
|-id=837 bgcolor=#d6d6d6
| 234837 ||  || — || September 11, 2002 || Palomar || NEAT || KOR || align=right | 2.0 km || 
|-id=838 bgcolor=#d6d6d6
| 234838 ||  || — || September 11, 2002 || Palomar || NEAT || KOR || align=right | 2.3 km || 
|-id=839 bgcolor=#d6d6d6
| 234839 ||  || — || September 11, 2002 || Haleakala || NEAT || EOS || align=right | 3.0 km || 
|-id=840 bgcolor=#d6d6d6
| 234840 ||  || — || September 12, 2002 || Palomar || NEAT || — || align=right | 3.5 km || 
|-id=841 bgcolor=#d6d6d6
| 234841 ||  || — || September 13, 2002 || Palomar || NEAT || — || align=right | 4.0 km || 
|-id=842 bgcolor=#d6d6d6
| 234842 ||  || — || September 13, 2002 || Palomar || NEAT || — || align=right | 3.9 km || 
|-id=843 bgcolor=#d6d6d6
| 234843 ||  || — || September 14, 2002 || Kitt Peak || Spacewatch || THM || align=right | 2.5 km || 
|-id=844 bgcolor=#d6d6d6
| 234844 ||  || — || September 13, 2002 || Palomar || NEAT || EUP || align=right | 4.3 km || 
|-id=845 bgcolor=#d6d6d6
| 234845 ||  || — || September 11, 2002 || Palomar || NEAT || — || align=right | 6.0 km || 
|-id=846 bgcolor=#d6d6d6
| 234846 ||  || — || September 13, 2002 || Socorro || LINEAR || — || align=right | 4.3 km || 
|-id=847 bgcolor=#d6d6d6
| 234847 ||  || — || September 13, 2002 || Palomar || NEAT || EUP || align=right | 5.8 km || 
|-id=848 bgcolor=#d6d6d6
| 234848 ||  || — || September 12, 2002 || Palomar || NEAT || — || align=right | 3.8 km || 
|-id=849 bgcolor=#d6d6d6
| 234849 ||  || — || September 12, 2002 || Palomar || NEAT || — || align=right | 3.6 km || 
|-id=850 bgcolor=#d6d6d6
| 234850 ||  || — || September 14, 2002 || Palomar || NEAT || — || align=right | 2.8 km || 
|-id=851 bgcolor=#d6d6d6
| 234851 ||  || — || September 13, 2002 || Socorro || LINEAR || — || align=right | 5.9 km || 
|-id=852 bgcolor=#E9E9E9
| 234852 ||  || — || September 13, 2002 || Anderson Mesa || LONEOS || GEF || align=right | 5.0 km || 
|-id=853 bgcolor=#E9E9E9
| 234853 ||  || — || September 15, 2002 || Palomar || NEAT || — || align=right | 3.3 km || 
|-id=854 bgcolor=#d6d6d6
| 234854 ||  || — || September 14, 2002 || Haleakala || NEAT || — || align=right | 5.1 km || 
|-id=855 bgcolor=#d6d6d6
| 234855 ||  || — || September 14, 2002 || Palomar || NEAT || — || align=right | 3.9 km || 
|-id=856 bgcolor=#d6d6d6
| 234856 ||  || — || September 11, 2002 || Palomar || M. White, M. Collins || — || align=right | 3.4 km || 
|-id=857 bgcolor=#d6d6d6
| 234857 ||  || — || September 11, 2002 || Palomar || M. White, M. Collins || — || align=right | 3.3 km || 
|-id=858 bgcolor=#E9E9E9
| 234858 ||  || — || September 12, 2002 || Palomar || R. Matson || — || align=right | 2.9 km || 
|-id=859 bgcolor=#d6d6d6
| 234859 ||  || — || September 1, 2002 || Palomar || NEAT || — || align=right | 2.9 km || 
|-id=860 bgcolor=#d6d6d6
| 234860 ||  || — || September 14, 2002 || Palomar || NEAT || CHA || align=right | 3.1 km || 
|-id=861 bgcolor=#d6d6d6
| 234861 ||  || — || September 15, 2002 || Palomar || NEAT || — || align=right | 2.8 km || 
|-id=862 bgcolor=#d6d6d6
| 234862 ||  || — || September 13, 2002 || Palomar || NEAT || — || align=right | 3.9 km || 
|-id=863 bgcolor=#d6d6d6
| 234863 ||  || — || September 13, 2002 || Palomar || NEAT || — || align=right | 2.8 km || 
|-id=864 bgcolor=#E9E9E9
| 234864 ||  || — || September 14, 2002 || Palomar || NEAT || — || align=right | 2.5 km || 
|-id=865 bgcolor=#E9E9E9
| 234865 ||  || — || September 4, 2002 || Palomar || NEAT || AST || align=right | 3.8 km || 
|-id=866 bgcolor=#d6d6d6
| 234866 ||  || — || September 4, 2002 || Palomar || NEAT || — || align=right | 2.3 km || 
|-id=867 bgcolor=#d6d6d6
| 234867 ||  || — || September 27, 2002 || Palomar || NEAT || — || align=right | 5.3 km || 
|-id=868 bgcolor=#d6d6d6
| 234868 ||  || — || September 28, 2002 || Haleakala || NEAT || ALA || align=right | 5.5 km || 
|-id=869 bgcolor=#d6d6d6
| 234869 ||  || — || September 29, 2002 || Haleakala || NEAT || EOS || align=right | 3.8 km || 
|-id=870 bgcolor=#d6d6d6
| 234870 ||  || — || September 29, 2002 || Haleakala || NEAT || — || align=right | 3.9 km || 
|-id=871 bgcolor=#d6d6d6
| 234871 ||  || — || September 30, 2002 || Ondřejov || P. Pravec || — || align=right | 5.2 km || 
|-id=872 bgcolor=#d6d6d6
| 234872 ||  || — || September 28, 2002 || Palomar || NEAT || — || align=right | 4.0 km || 
|-id=873 bgcolor=#d6d6d6
| 234873 ||  || — || September 30, 2002 || Socorro || LINEAR || — || align=right | 4.1 km || 
|-id=874 bgcolor=#d6d6d6
| 234874 ||  || — || September 16, 2002 || Palomar || NEAT || — || align=right | 4.0 km || 
|-id=875 bgcolor=#d6d6d6
| 234875 ||  || — || September 16, 2002 || Palomar || NEAT || — || align=right | 3.7 km || 
|-id=876 bgcolor=#E9E9E9
| 234876 ||  || — || September 16, 2002 || Palomar || NEAT || — || align=right | 2.0 km || 
|-id=877 bgcolor=#d6d6d6
| 234877 ||  || — || October 1, 2002 || Anderson Mesa || LONEOS || — || align=right | 4.6 km || 
|-id=878 bgcolor=#d6d6d6
| 234878 ||  || — || October 2, 2002 || Socorro || LINEAR || — || align=right | 5.1 km || 
|-id=879 bgcolor=#d6d6d6
| 234879 ||  || — || October 2, 2002 || Haleakala || NEAT || EOS || align=right | 2.8 km || 
|-id=880 bgcolor=#d6d6d6
| 234880 ||  || — || October 2, 2002 || Socorro || LINEAR || — || align=right | 4.7 km || 
|-id=881 bgcolor=#d6d6d6
| 234881 ||  || — || October 2, 2002 || Socorro || LINEAR || 7:4 || align=right | 7.0 km || 
|-id=882 bgcolor=#d6d6d6
| 234882 ||  || — || October 1, 2002 || Anderson Mesa || LONEOS || EOS || align=right | 2.9 km || 
|-id=883 bgcolor=#d6d6d6
| 234883 ||  || — || October 3, 2002 || Campo Imperatore || CINEOS || — || align=right | 5.1 km || 
|-id=884 bgcolor=#d6d6d6
| 234884 ||  || — || October 1, 2002 || Anderson Mesa || LONEOS || — || align=right | 3.9 km || 
|-id=885 bgcolor=#d6d6d6
| 234885 ||  || — || October 1, 2002 || Socorro || LINEAR || EOS || align=right | 3.1 km || 
|-id=886 bgcolor=#d6d6d6
| 234886 ||  || — || October 3, 2002 || Palomar || NEAT || slow || align=right | 5.3 km || 
|-id=887 bgcolor=#d6d6d6
| 234887 ||  || — || October 4, 2002 || Anderson Mesa || LONEOS || TIR || align=right | 4.1 km || 
|-id=888 bgcolor=#d6d6d6
| 234888 ||  || — || October 2, 2002 || Socorro || LINEAR || EOS || align=right | 2.8 km || 
|-id=889 bgcolor=#d6d6d6
| 234889 ||  || — || October 3, 2002 || Socorro || LINEAR || 7:4 || align=right | 5.7 km || 
|-id=890 bgcolor=#d6d6d6
| 234890 ||  || — || October 3, 2002 || Palomar || NEAT || — || align=right | 5.7 km || 
|-id=891 bgcolor=#d6d6d6
| 234891 ||  || — || October 3, 2002 || Palomar || NEAT || — || align=right | 7.2 km || 
|-id=892 bgcolor=#d6d6d6
| 234892 ||  || — || October 4, 2002 || Palomar || NEAT || EOS || align=right | 3.3 km || 
|-id=893 bgcolor=#d6d6d6
| 234893 ||  || — || October 4, 2002 || Palomar || NEAT || — || align=right | 4.1 km || 
|-id=894 bgcolor=#d6d6d6
| 234894 ||  || — || October 4, 2002 || Anderson Mesa || LONEOS || — || align=right | 4.9 km || 
|-id=895 bgcolor=#d6d6d6
| 234895 ||  || — || October 4, 2002 || Socorro || LINEAR || EOS || align=right | 3.1 km || 
|-id=896 bgcolor=#d6d6d6
| 234896 ||  || — || October 5, 2002 || Palomar || NEAT || — || align=right | 4.9 km || 
|-id=897 bgcolor=#d6d6d6
| 234897 ||  || — || October 3, 2002 || Palomar || NEAT || LUT || align=right | 5.3 km || 
|-id=898 bgcolor=#d6d6d6
| 234898 ||  || — || October 5, 2002 || Palomar || NEAT || — || align=right | 5.3 km || 
|-id=899 bgcolor=#d6d6d6
| 234899 ||  || — || October 4, 2002 || Socorro || LINEAR || — || align=right | 4.4 km || 
|-id=900 bgcolor=#d6d6d6
| 234900 ||  || — || October 5, 2002 || Socorro || LINEAR || LIX || align=right | 5.6 km || 
|}

234901–235000 

|-bgcolor=#d6d6d6
| 234901 ||  || — || October 3, 2002 || Socorro || LINEAR || — || align=right | 3.9 km || 
|-id=902 bgcolor=#d6d6d6
| 234902 ||  || — || October 5, 2002 || Socorro || LINEAR || — || align=right | 4.8 km || 
|-id=903 bgcolor=#d6d6d6
| 234903 ||  || — || October 7, 2002 || Haleakala || NEAT || ANF || align=right | 2.3 km || 
|-id=904 bgcolor=#d6d6d6
| 234904 ||  || — || October 8, 2002 || Palomar || NEAT || — || align=right | 4.3 km || 
|-id=905 bgcolor=#d6d6d6
| 234905 ||  || — || October 10, 2002 || Palomar || NEAT || — || align=right | 3.0 km || 
|-id=906 bgcolor=#d6d6d6
| 234906 ||  || — || October 9, 2002 || Anderson Mesa || LONEOS || EOS || align=right | 2.9 km || 
|-id=907 bgcolor=#d6d6d6
| 234907 ||  || — || October 7, 2002 || Socorro || LINEAR || — || align=right | 6.0 km || 
|-id=908 bgcolor=#d6d6d6
| 234908 ||  || — || October 8, 2002 || Anderson Mesa || LONEOS || — || align=right | 4.3 km || 
|-id=909 bgcolor=#d6d6d6
| 234909 ||  || — || October 10, 2002 || Socorro || LINEAR || — || align=right | 4.7 km || 
|-id=910 bgcolor=#d6d6d6
| 234910 ||  || — || October 9, 2002 || Socorro || LINEAR || EOS || align=right | 2.9 km || 
|-id=911 bgcolor=#d6d6d6
| 234911 ||  || — || October 9, 2002 || Socorro || LINEAR || — || align=right | 4.6 km || 
|-id=912 bgcolor=#d6d6d6
| 234912 ||  || — || October 10, 2002 || Socorro || LINEAR || EOS || align=right | 3.2 km || 
|-id=913 bgcolor=#d6d6d6
| 234913 ||  || — || October 10, 2002 || Socorro || LINEAR || — || align=right | 4.7 km || 
|-id=914 bgcolor=#d6d6d6
| 234914 ||  || — || October 15, 2002 || Palomar || NEAT || — || align=right | 5.1 km || 
|-id=915 bgcolor=#d6d6d6
| 234915 ||  || — || October 5, 2002 || Apache Point || SDSS || — || align=right | 4.0 km || 
|-id=916 bgcolor=#d6d6d6
| 234916 ||  || — || October 5, 2002 || Apache Point || SDSS || — || align=right | 3.0 km || 
|-id=917 bgcolor=#d6d6d6
| 234917 ||  || — || October 5, 2002 || Apache Point || SDSS || — || align=right | 3.7 km || 
|-id=918 bgcolor=#E9E9E9
| 234918 ||  || — || October 5, 2002 || Apache Point || SDSS || PAD || align=right | 3.4 km || 
|-id=919 bgcolor=#E9E9E9
| 234919 ||  || — || October 5, 2002 || Apache Point || SDSS || — || align=right | 2.5 km || 
|-id=920 bgcolor=#d6d6d6
| 234920 ||  || — || October 10, 2002 || Apache Point || SDSS || URS || align=right | 4.7 km || 
|-id=921 bgcolor=#d6d6d6
| 234921 ||  || — || October 10, 2002 || Apache Point || SDSS || MEL || align=right | 5.7 km || 
|-id=922 bgcolor=#d6d6d6
| 234922 ||  || — || October 10, 2002 || Apache Point || SDSS || NAE || align=right | 4.0 km || 
|-id=923 bgcolor=#d6d6d6
| 234923 ||  || — || October 9, 2002 || Palomar || NEAT || TEL || align=right | 2.0 km || 
|-id=924 bgcolor=#d6d6d6
| 234924 ||  || — || October 15, 2002 || Palomar || NEAT || — || align=right | 4.5 km || 
|-id=925 bgcolor=#d6d6d6
| 234925 ||  || — || October 28, 2002 || Socorro || LINEAR || EUP || align=right | 7.3 km || 
|-id=926 bgcolor=#d6d6d6
| 234926 ||  || — || October 28, 2002 || Palomar || NEAT || TIR || align=right | 3.7 km || 
|-id=927 bgcolor=#fefefe
| 234927 ||  || — || October 26, 2002 || Haleakala || NEAT || — || align=right data-sort-value="0.94" | 940 m || 
|-id=928 bgcolor=#fefefe
| 234928 ||  || — || October 28, 2002 || Kvistaberg || UDAS || — || align=right data-sort-value="0.91" | 910 m || 
|-id=929 bgcolor=#d6d6d6
| 234929 ||  || — || October 30, 2002 || Palomar || NEAT || — || align=right | 6.0 km || 
|-id=930 bgcolor=#E9E9E9
| 234930 ||  || — || October 30, 2002 || Haleakala || NEAT || — || align=right | 3.9 km || 
|-id=931 bgcolor=#d6d6d6
| 234931 ||  || — || October 30, 2002 || Kitt Peak || Spacewatch || — || align=right | 3.7 km || 
|-id=932 bgcolor=#d6d6d6
| 234932 ||  || — || October 31, 2002 || Socorro || LINEAR || — || align=right | 5.1 km || 
|-id=933 bgcolor=#d6d6d6
| 234933 ||  || — || October 31, 2002 || Palomar || NEAT || — || align=right | 5.9 km || 
|-id=934 bgcolor=#d6d6d6
| 234934 ||  || — || October 30, 2002 || Palomar || NEAT || — || align=right | 3.9 km || 
|-id=935 bgcolor=#d6d6d6
| 234935 ||  || — || October 31, 2002 || Socorro || LINEAR || — || align=right | 4.5 km || 
|-id=936 bgcolor=#d6d6d6
| 234936 ||  || — || October 31, 2002 || Socorro || LINEAR || — || align=right | 5.3 km || 
|-id=937 bgcolor=#d6d6d6
| 234937 ||  || — || October 30, 2002 || Apache Point || SDSS || TEL || align=right | 2.3 km || 
|-id=938 bgcolor=#d6d6d6
| 234938 ||  || — || November 1, 2002 || Palomar || NEAT || — || align=right | 4.5 km || 
|-id=939 bgcolor=#d6d6d6
| 234939 ||  || — || November 5, 2002 || Kvistaberg || UDAS || — || align=right | 5.3 km || 
|-id=940 bgcolor=#d6d6d6
| 234940 ||  || — || November 5, 2002 || Anderson Mesa || LONEOS || — || align=right | 4.4 km || 
|-id=941 bgcolor=#d6d6d6
| 234941 ||  || — || November 5, 2002 || Socorro || LINEAR || — || align=right | 3.6 km || 
|-id=942 bgcolor=#d6d6d6
| 234942 ||  || — || November 5, 2002 || Socorro || LINEAR || — || align=right | 4.5 km || 
|-id=943 bgcolor=#d6d6d6
| 234943 ||  || — || November 5, 2002 || Socorro || LINEAR || TIR || align=right | 5.4 km || 
|-id=944 bgcolor=#d6d6d6
| 234944 ||  || — || November 5, 2002 || Palomar || NEAT || — || align=right | 4.6 km || 
|-id=945 bgcolor=#d6d6d6
| 234945 ||  || — || November 6, 2002 || Anderson Mesa || LONEOS || — || align=right | 5.5 km || 
|-id=946 bgcolor=#d6d6d6
| 234946 ||  || — || November 6, 2002 || Anderson Mesa || LONEOS || EOS || align=right | 3.0 km || 
|-id=947 bgcolor=#d6d6d6
| 234947 ||  || — || November 6, 2002 || Socorro || LINEAR || — || align=right | 5.0 km || 
|-id=948 bgcolor=#d6d6d6
| 234948 ||  || — || November 4, 2002 || La Palma || La Palma Obs. || — || align=right | 3.6 km || 
|-id=949 bgcolor=#d6d6d6
| 234949 ||  || — || November 7, 2002 || Socorro || LINEAR || EUP || align=right | 6.0 km || 
|-id=950 bgcolor=#d6d6d6
| 234950 ||  || — || November 8, 2002 || Socorro || LINEAR || — || align=right | 5.1 km || 
|-id=951 bgcolor=#d6d6d6
| 234951 ||  || — || November 8, 2002 || Socorro || LINEAR || — || align=right | 5.0 km || 
|-id=952 bgcolor=#d6d6d6
| 234952 ||  || — || November 11, 2002 || Anderson Mesa || LONEOS || EMA || align=right | 4.9 km || 
|-id=953 bgcolor=#d6d6d6
| 234953 ||  || — || November 12, 2002 || Anderson Mesa || LONEOS || — || align=right | 4.9 km || 
|-id=954 bgcolor=#d6d6d6
| 234954 ||  || — || November 11, 2002 || Socorro || LINEAR || EOS || align=right | 2.8 km || 
|-id=955 bgcolor=#d6d6d6
| 234955 ||  || — || November 13, 2002 || Palomar || NEAT || — || align=right | 4.6 km || 
|-id=956 bgcolor=#d6d6d6
| 234956 ||  || — || November 13, 2002 || Palomar || NEAT || — || align=right | 3.7 km || 
|-id=957 bgcolor=#d6d6d6
| 234957 ||  || — || November 3, 2002 || Palomar || NEAT || — || align=right | 4.7 km || 
|-id=958 bgcolor=#d6d6d6
| 234958 ||  || — || November 24, 2002 || Palomar || NEAT || HYG || align=right | 4.2 km || 
|-id=959 bgcolor=#d6d6d6
| 234959 ||  || — || November 24, 2002 || Palomar || NEAT || THM || align=right | 3.6 km || 
|-id=960 bgcolor=#fefefe
| 234960 ||  || — || November 28, 2002 || Campo Imperatore || CINEOS || — || align=right | 1.1 km || 
|-id=961 bgcolor=#d6d6d6
| 234961 ||  || — || November 28, 2002 || Anderson Mesa || LONEOS || — || align=right | 4.6 km || 
|-id=962 bgcolor=#d6d6d6
| 234962 ||  || — || November 30, 2002 || Socorro || LINEAR || VER || align=right | 4.1 km || 
|-id=963 bgcolor=#d6d6d6
| 234963 ||  || — || November 22, 2002 || Palomar || NEAT || — || align=right | 3.1 km || 
|-id=964 bgcolor=#fefefe
| 234964 ||  || — || December 4, 2002 || Socorro || LINEAR || PHO || align=right | 1.5 km || 
|-id=965 bgcolor=#d6d6d6
| 234965 ||  || — || December 1, 2002 || Socorro || LINEAR || — || align=right | 4.4 km || 
|-id=966 bgcolor=#d6d6d6
| 234966 ||  || — || December 2, 2002 || Socorro || LINEAR || — || align=right | 4.1 km || 
|-id=967 bgcolor=#d6d6d6
| 234967 ||  || — || December 3, 2002 || Palomar || NEAT || — || align=right | 5.1 km || 
|-id=968 bgcolor=#fefefe
| 234968 ||  || — || December 12, 2002 || Socorro || LINEAR || — || align=right | 1.8 km || 
|-id=969 bgcolor=#d6d6d6
| 234969 ||  || — || December 11, 2002 || Socorro || LINEAR || HYG || align=right | 4.9 km || 
|-id=970 bgcolor=#d6d6d6
| 234970 ||  || — || December 10, 2002 || Palomar || NEAT || — || align=right | 4.8 km || 
|-id=971 bgcolor=#fefefe
| 234971 ||  || — || December 5, 2002 || Anderson Mesa || LONEOS || — || align=right data-sort-value="0.98" | 980 m || 
|-id=972 bgcolor=#fefefe
| 234972 ||  || — || December 27, 2002 || Socorro || LINEAR || — || align=right | 1.3 km || 
|-id=973 bgcolor=#fefefe
| 234973 ||  || — || December 28, 2002 || Socorro || LINEAR || — || align=right | 1.6 km || 
|-id=974 bgcolor=#fefefe
| 234974 ||  || — || December 28, 2002 || Socorro || LINEAR || PHO || align=right | 3.6 km || 
|-id=975 bgcolor=#fefefe
| 234975 ||  || — || December 31, 2002 || Socorro || LINEAR || — || align=right | 1.1 km || 
|-id=976 bgcolor=#fefefe
| 234976 ||  || — || December 31, 2002 || Socorro || LINEAR || — || align=right | 1.2 km || 
|-id=977 bgcolor=#fefefe
| 234977 ||  || — || December 31, 2002 || Socorro || LINEAR || FLO || align=right data-sort-value="0.79" | 790 m || 
|-id=978 bgcolor=#E9E9E9
| 234978 ||  || — || January 3, 2003 || Socorro || LINEAR || — || align=right | 4.8 km || 
|-id=979 bgcolor=#fefefe
| 234979 ||  || — || January 2, 2003 || Anderson Mesa || LONEOS || — || align=right | 2.6 km || 
|-id=980 bgcolor=#d6d6d6
| 234980 ||  || — || January 5, 2003 || Socorro || LINEAR || — || align=right | 6.7 km || 
|-id=981 bgcolor=#fefefe
| 234981 ||  || — || January 5, 2003 || Socorro || LINEAR || — || align=right | 1.2 km || 
|-id=982 bgcolor=#fefefe
| 234982 ||  || — || January 5, 2003 || Socorro || LINEAR || NYS || align=right | 2.7 km || 
|-id=983 bgcolor=#fefefe
| 234983 ||  || — || January 5, 2003 || Socorro || LINEAR || — || align=right | 1.2 km || 
|-id=984 bgcolor=#d6d6d6
| 234984 ||  || — || January 5, 2003 || Socorro || LINEAR || 7:4 || align=right | 6.6 km || 
|-id=985 bgcolor=#fefefe
| 234985 ||  || — || January 5, 2003 || Socorro || LINEAR || PHO || align=right | 1.4 km || 
|-id=986 bgcolor=#fefefe
| 234986 ||  || — || January 7, 2003 || Socorro || LINEAR || PHO || align=right | 1.7 km || 
|-id=987 bgcolor=#fefefe
| 234987 ||  || — || January 13, 2003 || Socorro || LINEAR || PHO || align=right | 2.0 km || 
|-id=988 bgcolor=#fefefe
| 234988 ||  || — || January 5, 2003 || Anderson Mesa || LONEOS || — || align=right | 2.3 km || 
|-id=989 bgcolor=#fefefe
| 234989 ||  || — || January 23, 2003 || Kitt Peak || Spacewatch || — || align=right | 1.3 km || 
|-id=990 bgcolor=#fefefe
| 234990 ||  || — || January 26, 2003 || Palomar || NEAT || FLO || align=right data-sort-value="0.97" | 970 m || 
|-id=991 bgcolor=#fefefe
| 234991 ||  || — || January 26, 2003 || Anderson Mesa || LONEOS || FLO || align=right | 1.1 km || 
|-id=992 bgcolor=#fefefe
| 234992 ||  || — || January 26, 2003 || Haleakala || NEAT || — || align=right | 1.6 km || 
|-id=993 bgcolor=#d6d6d6
| 234993 ||  || — || January 26, 2003 || Palomar || NEAT || ALA || align=right | 6.4 km || 
|-id=994 bgcolor=#fefefe
| 234994 ||  || — || January 27, 2003 || Socorro || LINEAR || — || align=right | 2.7 km || 
|-id=995 bgcolor=#d6d6d6
| 234995 ||  || — || January 27, 2003 || Palomar || NEAT || — || align=right | 5.2 km || 
|-id=996 bgcolor=#d6d6d6
| 234996 ||  || — || January 27, 2003 || Haleakala || NEAT || EUP || align=right | 6.5 km || 
|-id=997 bgcolor=#fefefe
| 234997 ||  || — || January 27, 2003 || Haleakala || NEAT || PHO || align=right | 3.1 km || 
|-id=998 bgcolor=#fefefe
| 234998 ||  || — || January 27, 2003 || Socorro || LINEAR || — || align=right | 1.2 km || 
|-id=999 bgcolor=#fefefe
| 234999 ||  || — || January 29, 2003 || Palomar || NEAT || — || align=right data-sort-value="0.98" | 980 m || 
|-id=000 bgcolor=#fefefe
| 235000 ||  || — || January 31, 2003 || Socorro || LINEAR || — || align=right | 1.1 km || 
|}

References

External links 
 Discovery Circumstances: Numbered Minor Planets (230001)–(235000) (IAU Minor Planet Center)

0234